The written history of Mexico spans more than three millennia. First populated more than 13,000 years ago, central and southern Mexico (termed Mesoamerica) saw the rise and fall of complex indigenous civilizations. Mexico would later develop into a unique multicultural society. Mesoamerican civilizations developed glyphic writing systems, recording the political history of conquests and rulers. Mesoamerican history prior to European arrival is called the prehispanic era or the pre-Columbian era. Following Mexico's independence from the Spanish Empire in 1821, political turmoil wracked the nation. France, with the help of Mexican conservatives, seized control in the 1860s during the Second Mexican Empire but was later defeated. Quiet prosperous growth was characteristic in the late 19th century but the Mexican Revolution in 1910 brought a bitter civil war. With calm restored in the 1920s, economic growth was steady while population growth was rapid.

Before European arrival

Large and complex civilizations developed in the center and southern regions of Mexico (with the southern region extending into what is now Central America) in what has come to be known as Mesoamerica. The civilizations that rose and declined over millennia were characterized by:
 significant urban settlements;
 monumental architecture such as temples, palaces, and other monumental architecture, such as the ball court;
 the division of society into religious, political, and political elites (such as warriors and merchants) and commoners who pursued subsistence agriculture;
 transfer of tribute and rending of labor from commoners to elites;
 reliance on agriculture often supplemented by hunting and fishing and the complete absence of a pastoral (herding) economy, since there were no domesticated herd animals prior to the arrival of the Europeans;
 trade networks and markets.

These civilizations arose in a region with no major navigable rivers, no beasts of burden, and difficult terrain that impeded the movement of people and goods. Indigenous civilizations developed complex ritual and solar calendars, a significant understanding of astronomy, and forms of communication written in glyphs.

The history of Mexico before the Spanish conquest is known through the work of archaeologists, epigraphers, and ethnohistorians (students of indigenous histories, usually from indigenous points of view), who analyze Mesoamerican indigenous manuscripts, particularly Aztec codices, Mayan codices, and Mixtec codices.

Accounts written by Spaniards at the time of the conquest (the conquistadores) and by Indigenous chroniclers of the postconquest period constitute the principal source of information regarding Mexico at the time of the Spanish Conquest.

Few pictorial manuscripts (or codices) of the Maya, Mixtec, and Mexica cultures of the Post-Classic period survive, but progress has been made particularly in the area of Maya archaeology and epigraphy.

Beginnings

The presence of people in Mesoamerica was once thought to date back 40,000 years, an estimate based on what were believed to be ancient footprints discovered in the Valley of Mexico; but after further investigation using radiocarbon dating, it appears this date may not be accurate. It is currently unclear whether 23,000-year-old campfire remains found in the Valley of Mexico are the earliest human remains uncovered so far in Mexico.

The first people to settle in Mexico encountered a climate far milder than the current one. In particular, the Valley of Mexico contained several large paleo-lakes (known collectively as Lake Texcoco) surrounded by dense forest. Deer were found in this area, but most fauna were small land animals and fish and other lacustrine animals were found in the lake region. Such conditions encouraged the initial pursuit of a hunter-gatherer existence.

Indigenous peoples in western Mexico began to selectively breed maize (Zea mays) plants from precursor grasses (e.g., teosinte) between 5,000 and 10,000 years ago.

The diet of ancient central and southern Mexico was varied, including domesticated corn (or maize), squashes such as pumpkin and butternut squash, common beans (pinto, kidney, navy, and other common beans consumed today), tomatoes, peppers, cassavas, pineapples, chocolate, and tobacco. The Three Sisters (corn, squash, and beans) constituted the principal diet.

Religion
The Mesoamericans had the concept of deities and religion, but their concept was very different from Abrahamic concepts. Mesoamericans had belief systems where everything, every element of the cosmos, the earth, the sun, the moon, the stars, which mankind inhabits, everything that forms part of nature such as animals, plants, water and mountains all represented a manifestation of the supernatural. In most cases, gods and goddesses are often depicted in stone reliefs, pottery decoration, wall paintings and in the various Maya, and pictorial manuscripts such as Maya codices, Aztec codices, and Mixtec codices.

The spiritual pantheon was vast and extremely complex. However, many of the deities depicted are common to the various civilizations and their worship survived over long periods of time. They frequently took on different characteristics and even names in different areas, but in effect, they transcended cultures and time. Great masks with gaping jaws and monstrous features in stone or stucco were often located at the entrance to temples, symbolizing a cavern or cave on the flanks of the mountains that allowed access to the depths of Mother Earth and the shadowy roads that lead to the underworld.

Cults connected with the jaguar and jade especially permeated religion throughout Mesoamerica. Jade, with its translucent green color was revered along with water as a symbol of life and fertility. The jaguar, agile, powerful and fast, was especially connected with warriors and as spirit guides of shamans. Despite differences of chronology or geography, the crucial aspects of this religious pantheon were shared amongst the people of ancient Mesoamerica.

Thus, this quality of acceptance of new gods to the collection of existing gods may have been one of the shaping characteristics for success during the Christianization of Mesoamerica. New gods did not at once replace the old; they initially joined the ever-growing family of deities or were merged with existing ones that seemed to share similar characteristics or responsibilities. The Christianization of Europe also followed similar patterns of appropriation and transformation of existing deities.

A great deal is known about the Aztec religion due to the work of the early mendicant friars in their work to convert the Indigenous peoples to Christianity. The writings of Franciscans Fray Toribio de Benavente Motolinia and Fray Bernardino de Sahagún and Dominican Fray Diego Durán recorded a great deal about Nahua religion since they viewed understanding the ancient practices as essential for successfully converting the Indigenous populations to Christianity.

Writing
Mesoamerica is the only place in the Americas where indigenous writing systems were invented and used before European colonization. While the types of writing systems in Mesoamerica range from minimalist "picture-writing" to complex logophonetic systems capable of recording speech and literature, they all share some core features that make them visually and functionally distinct from other writing systems of the world.

Although many indigenous manuscripts have been lost or destroyed, texts are known Aztec codices, Mayan codices, and Mixtec codices still survive and are of intense interest to scholars of the prehispanic era.

The fact that there was an existing prehispanic tradition of writing meant that when the Spanish friars taught Mexican Natives to write their own languages, particularly Nahuatl, an alphabetic tradition took hold. It was used in official documents for legal cases and other legal instruments. The formal use of native language documentation lasted until Mexican independence in 1821. Beginning in the late twentieth century, scholars have mined these native language documents for information about colonial-era economics, culture, and language. The New Philology is the current name for this particular branch of colonial-era Mesoamerican ethnohistory.

Major civilizations

During the pre-Columbian period, many city-states, kingdoms, and empires competed with one another for power and prestige. Ancient Mexico can be said to have produced five major civilizations: the Olmec, Maya, Teotihuacan, Toltec, and Aztec. Unlike other indigenous Mexican societies, these civilizations (with the exception of the politically fragmented Maya) extended their political and cultural reach across Mexico and beyond.

They consolidated power and exercised influence in matters of trade, art, politics, technology, and religion. Over a span of 3,000 years, other regional powers made economic and political alliances with them; many made war on them. But almost all found themselves within their spheres of influence.

Olmecs (1500–400 BCE)

The Olmec first appeared along the Atlantic coast (in what is now the state of Tabasco) in the period 1500–900 BCE. The Olmecs were the first Mesoamerican culture to produce an identifiable artistic and cultural style, and may also have been the society that invented writing in Mesoamerica. By the Middle Preclassic Period (900–300 BCE), Olmec artistic styles had been adopted as far away as the Valley of Mexico and Costa Rica.

Maya

Maya cultural characteristics, such as the rise of the ahau, or king, can be traced from 300 BCE onward. During the centuries preceding the classical period, Maya kingdoms sprang up in an area stretching from the Pacific coasts of southern Mexico and Guatemala to the northern Yucatán Peninsula. The egalitarian Maya society of pre-royal centuries gradually gave way to a society controlled by a wealthy elite that began building large ceremonial temples and complexes.

The earliest known long-count date, 199 AD, heralds the classic period, during which the Maya kingdoms supported a population numbering in the millions. Tikal, the largest of the kingdoms, alone had 500,000 inhabitants, though the average population of a kingdom was much smaller—somewhere under 50,000 people. The Maya speak a diverse family of languages known as Mayan.

Teotihuacan

Teotihuacan is an enormous archaeological site in the Basin of Mexico, containing some of the largest pyramidal structures built in the pre-Columbian Americas. Apart from the pyramidal structures, Teotihuacan is also known for its large residential complexes, the Avenue of the Dead, and numerous colorful, well-preserved murals. Additionally, Teotihuacan produced a thin orange pottery style that spread through Mesoamerica.

The city is thought to have been established around 100 BCE and continued to be built until about 250 CE. The city may have lasted until sometime between the 7th and 8th centuries CE. At its zenith, perhaps in the first half of the 1st millennium CE, Teotihuacan was the largest city in the pre-Columbian Americas. At this time it may have had more than 200,000 inhabitants, placing it among the largest cities of the world in this period. Teotihuacan was even home to multi-floor apartment compounds built to accommodate this large population.

The civilization and cultural complex associated with the site is also referred to as Teotihuacan or Teotihuacano. Although it is a subject of debate whether Teotihuacan was the center of a state empire, its influence throughout Mesoamerica is well documented; evidence of Teotihuacano presence can be seen at numerous sites in Veracruz and the Maya region. The Aztecs may have been influenced by this city. The ethnicity of the inhabitants of Teotihuacan is also a subject of debate. Possible candidates are the Nahua, Otomi or Totonac ethnic groups. Scholars have also suggested that Teotihuacan was a multiethnic state.

Toltec

The Toltec culture is an archaeological Mesoamerican culture that dominated a state centered in Tula, Hidalgo, in the early post-classic period of Mesoamerican chronology (ca 800–1000 CE). The later Aztec culture saw the Toltecs as their intellectual and cultural predecessors and described Toltec culture emanating from Tollan (Nahuatl for Tula) as the epitome of civilization; indeed, in the Nahuatl language the word "Toltec" came to take on the meaning "artisan".

The Aztec oral and pictographic tradition also described the history of the Toltec empire giving lists of rulers and their exploits. Among modern scholars it is a matter of debate whether the Aztec narratives of Toltec history should be given credence as descriptions of actual historical events. While all scholars acknowledge that there is a large mythological part of the narrative some maintain that by using a critical comparative method some level of historicity can be salvaged from the sources, whereas others maintain that continued analysis of the narratives as sources of actual history is futile and hinders access to actual knowledge of the culture of Tula, Hidalgo.

Other controversy relating to the Toltecs include how best to understand reasons behind the perceived similarities in architecture and iconography between the archaeological site of Tula and the Maya site of Chichén Itzá – no consensus has emerged yet about the degree or direction of influence between the two sites.

Aztec Empire (1325–1521 AD)

The Nahua peoples began to enter central Mexico in the 6th century AD. By the 12th century, they had established their center at Azcapotzalco, the city of the Tepanecs.

The Mexica people arrived in the Valley of Mexico in 1248 AD. They had migrated from the deserts north of the Rio Grande  over a period traditionally said to have been 100 years. They may have thought of themselves as the heirs to the prestigious civilizations that had preceded them. What the Aztec initially lacked in political power, they made up for with ambition and military skill. In 1325, they established the biggest city in the world at that time, Tenochtitlan.

Aztec religion was based on the belief in the continual need for regular offering of human blood to keep their deities beneficent; to meet this need, the Aztec sacrificed thousands of people. This belief is thought to have been common throughout the Nahuatl people. To acquire captives in times of peace, the Aztec resorted to a form of ritual warfare called flower war. The Tlaxcalteca, among other Nahuatl nations, were forced into such wars.

In 1428, the Aztec led a war against their rulers from the city of Azcapotzalco, which had subjugated most of the Valley of Mexico's peoples. The revolt was successful, and the Aztecs became the rulers of central Mexico as the leaders of the Triple Alliance. The alliance was composed of the city-states of Tenochtitlan, Texcoco, and Tlacopan.

At their peak, 350,000 Aztec presided over a wealthy tribute-empire comprising 10 million people, almost half of Mexico's estimated population of 24 million. Their empire stretched from ocean to ocean, and extended into Central America. The westward expansion of the empire was halted by a devastating military defeat at the hands of the Purepecha (who possessed weapons made of copper). The empire relied upon a system of taxation (of goods and services), which were collected through an elaborate bureaucracy of tax collectors, courts, civil servants, and local officials who were installed as loyalists to the Triple Alliance.

By 1519, the Aztec capital, Mexico-Tenochtitlan, the site of modern-day Mexico City, was one of the largest cities in the world, with an estimated population between 200,000 and 300,000.

Spanish conquest

Mesoamerica on the eve of the Spanish conquest

The first mainland explorations were followed by a phase of inland expeditions and conquest. The Spanish crown extended the Reconquista effort, completed in Spain in 1492, to non-Catholic people in new territories. In 1502 on the coast of present-day Colombia, near the Gulf of Urabá, Spanish explorers led by Vasco Núñez de Balboa explored and conquered the area near the Atrato River.

The conquest was of the Chibcha-speaking nations, mainly the Muisca and Tairona indigenous people that lived here. The Spanish founded San Sebastian de Uraba in 1509—abandoned within the year, and in 1510 the first permanent Spanish mainland settlement in America, Santa María la Antigua del Darién.

The first Europeans to arrive in what is modern day Mexico were the survivors of a Spanish shipwreck in 1511. Only two managed to survive Gerónimo de Aguilar and Gonzalo Guerrero until further contact was made with Spanish explorers years later. On 8 February 1517 an expedition led by Francisco Hernández de Córdoba left the harbor of Santiago de Cuba to explore the shores of southern Mexico.

During the course of this expedition many of Hernández' men were killed, most during a battle near the town of Champotón against a Maya army. Hernández himself was injured, and died a few days shortly after his return to Cuba. This was the Europeans' first encounter with a civilization in the Americas with buildings and complex social organizations which they recognized as being comparable to those of the Old World. Hernán Cortés led a new expedition to Mexico landing ashore at present day Veracruz on 22 April 1519, a date which marks the beginning of 300 years of Spanish hegemony over the region.

In general the 'Spanish conquest of Mexico' denotes the conquest of the central region of Mesoamerica where the Aztec Empire was based. The fall of the Aztec capital of Tenochtitlan in 1521 was a decisive event, but the conquest of other regions of Mexico, such as Yucatán, extended long after Spaniards consolidated control of central Mexico. The Spanish conquest of Yucatán is the much longer campaign, from 1551 to 1697, against the Maya peoples of the Maya civilization in the Yucatán Peninsula of present-day Mexico and northern Central America.

Analysis of defeat 
The Alliance ambushed indigenous ceremonies, such as during the Massacre in the Great Temple, which allowed the Spanish conquerors to avoid fighting the best Aztec warriors in direct armed battle, killing a large number of unarmed Aztec elites.

Smallpox (Variola major and Variola minor) began to spread in Mesoamerica immediately after the arrival of Europeans. The indigenous peoples, who had no immunity to it, eventually died in the millions. A third of all the natives of the Valley of Mexico succumbed to it within six months of the Spaniards' arrival.

Aftermath of the conquest

Tenochtitlan was almost completely destroyed by fire and cannon fire. It was not a foregone idea that the site of Tenochtitlan would become the Spanish capital, but Cortés made it the capital.

Cortés imprisoned the royal families of the valley. To prevent another revolt, he personally tortured and killed Cuauhtémoc, the last Aztec Emperor; Coanacoch, the King of Texcoco, and Tetlepanquetzal, King of Tlacopan.

The Spanish had no intention to turn over Tenochtitlan to the Tlaxcalteca. While Tlaxcalteca troops continued to help the Spaniards, and Tlaxcala received better treatment than other indigenous nations, the Spanish eventually disowned the treaty. Forty years after the conquest, the Tlaxcalteca had to pay the same tax as any other indigenous community.

Political. The small contingent of Spaniards controlled central Mexico through existing indigenous rulers of individual political states (altepetl), who maintained their status as nobles in the post-conquest era if they cooperated with Spanish rule. 
Religious. Cortés immediately banned human sacrifice throughout the conquered empire. In 1524, he requested the Spanish king to send friars from the mendicant orders, particularly the Franciscan, Dominican, and Augustinian, to convert the indigenous to Christianity. This has often been called the "spiritual conquest of Mexico". Christian evangelization began in the early 1520s and continued into the 1560s. Many of the mendicant friars, especially the Franciscans and Dominicans, learned the native languages and recorded aspects of native culture, providing a principal source for our knowledge about them. One of the first 12 Franciscans to come to Mexico, Fray Toribio de Benavente Motolinia recorded in Spanish observations of the indigenous. Important Franciscans engaged in collecting and preparing native language materials, especially in Nahuatl are fray Alonso de Molina and fray Bernardino de Sahagún. 
Economics. The Spanish colonizers introduced the encomienda system of forced labor, which in central Mexico built on indigenous traditions of rendering tribute and labor to rulers in their own communities and local rulers rendering tribute to higher authorities. Individual Spaniards were awarded the tribute and labor or particular indigenous communities, with that population paying tribute and performing labor locally. Indigenous communities were pressed for labor services and tribute, but were not enslaved. Their rulers remained indigenous elites, who retained their status under colonial rule and were useful intermediaries. The Spanish also used forced labor, often outright slavery, in mining.

Spanish rule (1521–1821)

The capture of Tenochtitlan marked the beginning of a 300-year colonial period, during which Mexico was known as "New Spain" ruled by a viceroy in the name of the Spanish monarch. Colonial Mexico had key elements to attract Spanish immigrants: (1) dense and politically complex indigenous populations (especially in the central part) that could be compelled to work, and (2) huge mineral wealth, especially major silver deposits in the northern regions Zacatecas and Guanajuato. The Viceroyalty of Peru also had those two important elements, so that New Spain and Peru were the seats of Spanish power and the source of its wealth, until other viceroyalties were created in Spanish South America in the late 18th century.

This wealth made Spain the dominant power in Europe, rivalling England, France, and (after its independence from Spain) the Netherlands. Spain's silver mining and crown mints created high quality coins, the currency of Spanish America, the silver peso or Spanish dollar that became a global currency.

Continued conquests (1521–1550)

Spain did not bring all areas of Aztec Empire under its control. After the fall of Tenochtitlan in 1521, it took decades of sporadic warfare to subdue the rest of Mesoamerica, particularly the Mayan regions of southern New Spain and into what is now Central America. Spanish conquests in the Zapotec and Mixtec regions of southern Mesoamerica were relatively rapid.

Outside the zone of settled Mesoamerican civilizations were nomadic northern indios bárbaros ("wild Indians") who fought fiercely against the Spaniards and their indigenous allies, such as the Tlaxcalans, in the Chichimeca War (1550–1590). The northern indigenous populations had gained mobility via the horses that Spaniards had imported to the New World. The region was important to the Spanish because of its rich silver deposits. The Spanish mining settlements and trunk lines to Mexico City needed to be made safe for supplies to move north and silver to move to south, to central Mexico.

Economics of the early colonial period

The most important source of wealth was indigenous tribute and compelled labor, mobilized in the first years after the conquest of central Mexico through the encomienda. The encomienda was a grant of the labor of a particular indigenous settlement to an individual Spanish and his heirs. Conquerors expected to receive these awards and premier conqueror Hernán Cortés in his letter to the Spanish king justified his own allocation of these grants. Spaniards were the recipients of traditional indigenous products that had been rendered in tribute to their local lords and to the Aztec empire. The first Spanish viceroy, Don Antonio de Mendoza has his name given to the title of an Aztec manuscript Codex Mendoza, that enumerates in glyphic form the types of tribute goods and amounts rendered from particular indigenous towns under Aztec rule. The earliest holders of encomiendas, the encomenderos were the conquerors involved in the campaign leading to the fall of Tenochtitlan, and later their heirs and people with influence but not conquerors. Forced labor could be directed toward developing land and industry in the area the Spanish encomenderos' Natives lived. Land was a secondary source of wealth during this immediate conquest period. Where indigenous labor was absent or needed supplementing, the Spanish brought slaves, often as skilled laborers or artisans.

Evolution of race mixture 
Europeans, Africans, and indigenous intermixed, creating a mixed-race casta population in a process known as mestizaje. Mestizos, people of mixed European-indigenous ancestry, constitute the majority of Mexico's population.

Contours of the colonial period (1521–1821)

Colonial Mexico was part of the Spanish Empire and administered by the Viceroyalty of New Spain. The Spanish crown claimed all of the Western Hemisphere west of the line established between Spain and Portugal by the Treaty of Tordesillas. This included all of North America and South America, except for Brazil. The viceroyalty of New Spain had jurisdiction over Spain's northern empire in the Americas. When Spain established a colony in the Philippines in the late sixteenth century, the Viceroyalty of New Spain had jurisdiction over it, since there was more direct contact between the two than the Philippines with Spain.

Hernán Cortés had conquered the Aztec Empire and established New Spain as the largest and most important Spanish colony. During the 16th century, Spain focused on conquering areas with dense populations that had produced Pre-Columbian civilizations. These populations were a disciplined labor force and a population to convert to Christianity.

Territories populated by nomadic peoples were harder to conquer, and although the Spanish explored much of North America, seeking the fabled "El Dorado", they made no concerted effort to settle the northern desert regions in what is now the United States until the end of the 16th century (Santa Fe, 1598).

Colonial law with native origins but with Spanish historical precedents was introduced, creating a balance between local jurisdiction (the Cabildos) and the Crown's, whereby upper administrative offices were closed to natives, even those of pure Spanish blood. Administration was based on a racial separation of the population among the Republics of Spaniards, Natives and Mestizos, autonomous and directly dependent on the king. The population of New Spain was divided into four main groups, or classes. The group a person belonged to was determined by racial background and birthplace. The most powerful group was the Spaniards, people born in Spain and sent across the Atlantic to rule the colony. Only Spaniards could hold high-level jobs in the colonial government.

The second group, called criollos, where people of Spanish background but born in Mexico. Many criollos were prosperous landowners and merchants. But even the wealthiest creoles had little say in government.

The third group, the mestizos, were people who had some Spanish ancestors and some Native ancestors. The word mestizo means "mixed" in Spanish. Mestizos had a much lower position and were looked down upon by both the Spaniards and the creoles, who held the belief that people of full European background were superior to everyone else.

The poorest, most marginalised group in New Spain was the Natives, descendants of pre-Columbian peoples. They had less power and endured harsher conditions than other groups. Natives were forced to work as laborers on the ranches and farms (called haciendas) of the Spaniards and creoles.

In addition to the four main groups, there were also some Africans in colonial Mexico. These Africans were imported as laborers and shared the low status of the Natives. They made up about 4% to 5% of the population, and their mixed-race descendants, called mulattoes, eventually grew to represent about 9%.

From an economic point of view, New Spain was administered principally for the benefit of the Empire and its military and defensive efforts. Mexico provided more than half of the Empire taxes and supported the administration of all North and Central America. Competition with the metropolis was discouraged; for example cultivation of grapes and olives, introduced by Cortés himself, was banned out of fear that these crops would compete with Spain's.

To protect the country from the attacks by English, French and Dutch pirates, as well as the Crown's revenue, only two ports were open to foreign trade—Veracruz on the Atlantic and Acapulco on the Pacific. Pirates attacked, plundered and ravaged several cities like Campeche (1557), Veracruz (1568) and Alvarado (1667).

Education was encouraged by the Crown from the very beginning, and Mexico boasts the first primary school (Texcoco, 1523), first university, the University of Mexico (1551) and the first printing press (1524) of the Americas. Indigenous languages were studied mainly by the religious orders during the first centuries, and became official languages in the so-called Republic of Natives, only to be outlawed and ignored after independence by the prevailing Spanish-speaking creoles.

Mexico produced important cultural achievements during the colonial period, such as the literature of seventeenth-century nun, Sor Juana Inés de la Cruz, and Ruiz de Alarcón, as well as cathedrals, civil monuments, forts and colonial cities such as Puebla, Mexico City, Querétaro, Zacatecas and others, today part of Unesco's World Heritage.

The syncretism between indigenous and Spanish cultures gave rise to many of nowadays Mexican staple and world-famous cultural traits like tequila (since the 16th century), mariachi (18th), jarabe (17th), charros (17th) and the highly prized Mexican cuisine, fruit of the mixture of European and indigenous ingredients and techniques.

American-born Spaniards (creoles), mixed-race castas, and Natives often disagreed, but all resented the small minority of Iberian-born Spaniards who monopolized political power. By the early 1800s, many American-born Spaniards believed that Mexico should become independent of Spain, following the example of the United States. The man who touched off the revolt against Spain was the Catholic priest Miguel Hidalgo y Costilla. He is remembered today as the Father of the Nation.

Independence era (1808–1829)
This period was marked by unanticipated events that upended the three hundred years of Spanish colonial rule. The colony went from rule by the legitimate Spanish monarch and his appointed viceroy to an illegitimate monarch and viceroy put in place by a coup. Later, Mexico would see the return of the legitimate Spanish monarchy and a later stalemate with insurgent guerrilla forces. Events in Spain upended the situation in New Spain once again, with the Spanish military officers overthrowing the absolutist monarch and returning to the Spanish liberal constitution of 1812. Conservatives in New Spain who had staunchly defended the Spanish monarchy now saw a reason to change course and pursue independence. Royalist army officer Agustín de Iturbide became an advocate of independence and persuaded insurgent leader Vicente Guerrero to join in a coalition, forming the Army of the Three Guarantees. Within six months of that joint venture, royal rule in New Spain collapsed and independence was achieved. The constitutional monarchy envisioned with a European royal on the throne did not come to pass; rather, creole military officer Iturbide became Emperor Agustín I. His increasingly autocratic rule dismayed many and a coup overthrew him in 1823. Mexico became a federated republic and promulgated a constitution in 1824. While General Guadalupe Victoria became the first president, serving his entire term, the presidential transition became a less of an electoral event and more of one by force of arms. Insurgent general and prominent Liberal politician Guerrero was briefly president in 1829, then deposed and judicially murdered by his Conservative opponents. In the twenty years since the French invasion of Spain, Mexico had experienced political instability and violence, with more to come until the late nineteenth century. The presidency changed hands 75 times in the next half century. The new republic's situation did not promote economic growth or development, with the silver mines damaged, trade disrupted, and lingering violence. Although British merchants established a network of merchant houses in the major cities the situation was bleak. "Trade was stagnant, imports did not pay, contraband drove prices down, debts private and public went unpaid, merchants suffered all manner of injustices and operated at the mercy of weak and corruptible governments, commercial houses skirted bankruptcy."

Prelude to independence

Inspired by the American and French Revolutions, Mexican insurgents saw an opportunity for independence in 1808 when Napoleon invaded Spain and the Spanish king Charles IV was forced to abdicate. Napoleon placed his brother Joseph Bonaparte on the Spanish throne. For Spain and the Spanish Empire, this turn of events created a crisis of legitimacy of rule. In Spain, resistance to the French resulted in the Peninsular War. In New Spain, viceroy José de Iturrigaray proposed to provisionally form an autonomous government, with the support of American-born Spaniards on the city council of Mexico City. Peninsular-born Spaniards in the colony saw this as undermining their own power, and Gabriel J. de Yermo led a coup against the viceroy, arresting him in September 1808. Spanish military officer Pedro de Garibay was named as viceroy by the Spanish conspirators. His tenure was brief, from September 1808 until July 1809, when he was replaced by Francisco Javier de Lizana y Beaumont, whose tenure was also brief, until the arrival of viceroy Francisco Javier Venegas from Spain. Two days after his entry to Mexico City on 14 September 1810, Father Miguel Hidalgo made his call to arms in the village of Hidalgo. Spain was invaded by France and the Spanish king deposed and a usurper French king imposed. Like others in colonial Spanish America, New Spain's viceroy José de Iturrigaray, who was sympathetic to creoles, sought to create a legitimate government during the situation. He was overthrown by powerful Peninsular Spaniards and hard-line Spaniards clamped down on any notion of Mexican autonomy. Creoles who had hoped that there was a path to Mexican autonomy, perhaps within the Spanish Empire, now saw that their only path was independence through rebellion against the colonial regime. There were a number of creole conspiracies. In northern Mexico, Father Miguel Hidalgo, creole militia officer Ignacio Allende, and Juan Aldama met to plot rebellion. When the plot was discovered in September 1810, Hidalgo called his parishioners to arms in the village of Dolores, touching off a massive rebellion in the region of the Bajío. It even had Filipino support in the Manila-born Ramon Fabié an Engineer and Miner who supported Miguel Hidalgo in his revolt.

War of Independence, 1810-1821

In 1810, insurgent conspirators had plotted rebellion against royal government, which was again firmly in the hands of Peninsular Spaniards. When the plot was uncovered, Father Hidalgo summoned his parishioners of Dolores, exhorting them to action. This event of 16 September 1810 is now called the "Cry of Dolores", now celebrated as Independence Day. Shouting "Independence and death to the Spaniards!" From the small number of villagers some 80,000 poorly organized and armed formed a force that initially rampaged unstopped in Bajío. The viceroy was slow to respond, but once the royal army engaged the untrained, poorly armed and led mass, they routed the insurgents. Hidalgo was captured, defrocked as a priest, and executed, with his head left on a pike on the granary in Guanajuato as a warning to other insurrectionists.

Another priest, José María Morelos took over and was more successful in his quest for republicanism and independence. Spain's monarchy was restored in 1814 after Napoleon's defeat, and it fought back and executed Morelos in 1815. The scattered insurgents formed guerrilla bands. In 1820, Spanish royal army brigadier, Agustín de Iturbide, changed sides and proposed independence, issuing the Plan of Iguala. Iturbide persuaded insurgent leader Vicente Guerrero to join in this new push for independence. He was persuaded by Guerrero's charisma and idealism as well as the tenacity of his soldiers which included the Mexican of Filipino descent, General Isidoro Montes de Oca who with few and poorly armed insurgents, inflicted a real defeat on the royalist Gabriel from Armijo and they also got enough equipment to properly arm 1,800 soldiers of freedom who in the future will deserve the respect of Iturbide. He stood out for his courage in the siege of the Port of Acapulco in 1813, under the orders of General José María Morelos y Pavón. Isidoro and his soldiers from Guerrero State which was settled by immigrants from the Philippines, inflicted defeat on the royalist army from Spain. Impressed, Itubide joined forces with Guerrero and demanded independence, a constitutional monarchy in Mexico, the continued religious monopoly for the Catholic Church, and equality for Spaniards and those born in Mexico. Royalists who now followed Iturbide's change of sides and insurgents formed the Army of the Three Guarantees. Within six months, the new army was in control of all but the ports of Veracruz and Acapulco. On September 27, 1821, Iturbide and the last viceroy, Juan O'Donojú signed the Treaty of Córdoba whereby Spain granted the demands. O'Donojú had been operating under instructions that had been issued months before the latest turn of events. Spain refused to formally recognize Mexico's independence and the situation became even more complicated by O'Donojú's death in October 1821.

First Mexican Empire

When Mexico achieved its independence, the southern portion of New Spain became independent as well, as a result of the Treaty of Córdoba, so Central America, present-day Costa Rica, El Salvador, Guatemala, Honduras, Nicaragua, and part of Chiapas were incorporated into the Mexican Empire. Although Mexico now had its own government, there was no revolutionary change either socially or economically. The formal, legal racial distinctions were abolished, but power remained in the hands of white elites. Monarchy was the form of government Mexicans knew and it is not surprising that it chose that form of government initially. The political power of the royal government was transferred to the military. The Roman Catholic Church was the other pillar of institutional rule. Both the army and the church lost personnel with the establishment of the new regime. An index of the fall in the economy was the decrease in revenues to the church via the tithe, a tax on agricultural output. Mining especially was hard hit. It had been the motor of the colonial economy, but there was considerable fighting during the war of independence in Zacatecas and Guanajuato, the two most important silver mining sites. In spite of Viceroy O'Donojú's having signed the Treaty of Córdoba giving Mexico its independence, the Spanish government did not recognize it as legitimate and claimed sovereignty over Mexico.

Spain set in motion events that brought Iturbide, the son of a provincial merchant, as Emperor of Mexico. With Spain's rejection of the treaty and with no European royal taking up the offer of being Mexico's monarch, many creoles now decided that having a Mexican as its monarch was acceptable. A local army garrison proclaimed Iturbide emperor. Since the church refused to crown him, the president of the constituent congress did on 21 July 1822. His long-term rule was doomed. He did not have the respect of the Mexican nobility. Republicans sought that form of government rather than a monarchy. The emperor set up all the trappings of a monarchy with a court and fine robes of power. His actions as increasingly dictatorial and shutting down criticism led him to shut down congress. Worried that a brilliant young colonel, Antonio López de Santa Anna, would raise a rebellion, the emperor relieved him of his command. Rather than obeying the order, Santa Anna proclaimed a republic and hastily called for the reconvening of congress. Four days later he walked back his republicanism and simply called for the removal of the emperor, in the Plan of Casa Mata. Santa Anna secured the support of insurgent general Guadalupe Victoria. The army signed on to the plan and the emperor abdicated on 19 March 1823.

First Mexican Republic

Those who overthrew the emperor then nullified the Plan of Iguala, which had called for a constitutional monarchy, as well as the Treaty of Córdoba, leaving them free to choose whatever form of government they could agree on. It was to be a federal republic, and 4 October 1824, the United Mexican States (Spanish: Estados Unidos Mexicanos) was established. The new constitution was partly modeled on the constitution of the United States. It guaranteed basic human rights and defined Mexico as a representative federal republic, in which responsibilities of government were divided between a central government and a number of smaller units called states. It also defined Catholicism as the official and only religion of the republic. Central America did not join the federated republic and took a separate political path from 1 July 1823.

Mexico's establishment of a new, untried form of government did not bring stability. The army remained the political power, and the Roman Catholic Church the sole religious power. Both the army and the church retained special privileges in the new era. General Guadalupe Victoria was followed in office by General Vicente Guerrero, gaining the position through a coup after losing the 1828 elections, the Conservative Party saw an opportunity to seize control and led a counter-coup under General Anastasio Bustamante, who served as president from 1830 to 1832, and again from 1837 to 1841.

The Age of Santa Anna (1829–1854)

Political instability

In much of Spanish America soon after its independence, military strongmen or caudillos dominated politics, and this period is often called "The Age of Caudillismo". In Mexico, from the late 1820s to the mid-1850s the period is often called the "Age of Santa Anna", named for the general and politician, Antonio López de Santa Anna. Liberals (federalists) asked Santa Anna to overthrow conservative President Anastasio Bustamante. After he did, he declared General Manuel Gómez Pedraza (who won the election of 1828) president. Elections were held thereafter, and Santa Anna took office in 1832. He served as president 11 times. Constantly changing his political beliefs, in 1834 Santa Anna abrogated the federal constitution, causing insurgencies in the southeastern state of Yucatán and the northernmost portion of the northern state of Coahuila y Tejas. Both areas sought independence from the central government. Negotiations and the presence of Santa Anna's army caused Yucatán to recognize Mexican sovereignty. Then Santa Anna's army turned to the northern rebellion.

The inhabitants of Tejas declared the Republic of Texas independent from Mexico on 2 March 1836 at Washington-on-the-Brazos. They called themselves Texans and were led mainly by recent Anglo-American settlers. At the Battle of San Jacinto on April 21, 1836, Texan militiamen defeated the Mexican army and captured General Santa Anna. The Mexican government refused to recognize the independence of Texas.

Comanche conflict

The northern states grew increasingly isolated, economically and politically, due to prolonged Comanche raids and attacks. The indigenous peoples of the north had not recognized the Spanish Empire's claims to the region, nor did they when Mexico became an independent nation. Mexico attempted to convince their citizens to settle in the region, but with few takers. Mexico negotiated a contract with Anglo Americans to settle in the area, with the hope and expectation that they would do so in Comanche territory, the Comancheria. In the 1820s, when the United States began to exert influence over the region, New Mexico had already begun to question its loyalty to Mexico. By the time of the Mexican–American War, the Comanches had raided and pillaged large portions of northern Mexico, resulting in sustained impoverishment, political fragmentation, and general frustration at the inability—or unwillingness—of the Mexican government to discipline the Comanches.

In addition to Comanche raids, the First Republic's northern border was plagued with attacks on its northern border from the Apache people, who were supplied with guns by American merchants. Goods including guns and shoes were sold to the Apache, the latter being discovered by Mexican forces when they found traditional Apache trails with American shoe prints instead of moccasin prints.

Texas independence

Soon after achieving independence from Spain, the Mexican government, in an effort to populate its northern territories, awarded extensive land grants in Coahuila y Tejas to thousands of families from the United States, on condition that the settlers convert to Catholicism and become Mexican citizens. The Mexican government also forbade the importation of slaves. These conditions were largely ignored.

A key factor in the government decision to allow those settlers was the belief that they would (a) protect northern Mexico from Comanche attacks and (b) buffer the northern states against US westward expansion. The policy failed on both counts: the Americans tended to settle far from the Comanche raiding zones and used the Mexican government's failure to suppress the raids as a pretext for declaring independence.

The Texas Revolution or Texas War of Independence was a military conflict between Mexico and settlers in the Texas portion of the Mexican state Coahuila y Tejas.

The war lasted from October 2, 1835 to April 21, 1836. However, a war at sea between Mexico and Texas continued into the 1840s. Animosity between the Mexican government and the American settlers in Texas, as well as many Texas residents of Mexican ancestry, began with the Siete Leyes of 1835, when Mexican President and General Antonio López de Santa Anna abolished the federal Constitution of 1824 and proclaimed the more centralizing 1835 constitution in its place.

War began in Texas on October 2, 1835, with the Battle of Gonzales. Early Texian Army successes at La Bahia and San Antonio were soon met with crushing defeat at the same locations a few months later. The war ended at the Battle of San Jacinto where General Sam Houston led the Texian Army to victory over a portion of the Mexican Army under Santa Anna, who was captured soon after the battle. The end of the war resulted in the creation of the Republic of Texas in 1836. In 1845, the U.S. Congress ratified Texas's petition for statehood.

Mexican-American War (1846–1848) 

In response to a Mexican massacre of a U.S. army detachment in disputed territory, the U.S. Congress declared war on May 13, 1846; Mexico followed suit on 23 May. The Mexican–American War took place in two theaters: the western (aimed at California) and Central Mexico (aimed at capturing Mexico City) campaigns.

In March 1847, U.S. President James K. Polk sent an army of 12,000 volunteer and regular U.S. Army soldiers under General Winfield Scott to the port of Veracruz. The 70 ships of the invading forces arrived at the city on 7 March and began a naval bombardment. After landing his men, horses, and supplies, Scott began the Siege of Veracruz.

The city, at that time still walled, was defended by Mexican General Juan Morales with 3,400 men. Veracruz replied as best it could with artillery to the bombardment from land and sea, but the city walls were reduced. After 12 days, the Mexicans surrendered. Scott marched west with 8,500 men, while Santa Anna entrenched with artillery and 12,000 troops on the main road halfway to Mexico City. At the Battle of Cerro Gordo, Santa Anna was outflanked and routed.

Scott pushed on to Puebla, Mexico's second largest city, which capitulated without resistance on 1 May—the citizens were hostile to Santa Anna. After the Battle of Chapultepec (13 September 1847), Mexico City was occupied; Scott became its military governor. Many other parts of Mexico were also occupied. Some Mexican units fought with distinction. One of the justly commemorated units was a group of six young Military College cadets (now considered Mexican national heroes), who fought to the death defending their college during the Battle of Chapultepec.

The war ended with the Treaty of Guadalupe Hidalgo, which stipulated that (1) Mexico must sell its northern territories to the US for US$15 million; (2) the US would give full citizenship and voting rights, and protect the property rights of Mexicans living in the ceded territories; and (3) the US would assume $3.25 million in debt owed by Mexico to Americans. The war was Mexico's first encounter with a modern, well-organized, and well-equipped army. Mexico's defeat has been attributed to its problematic internal situation, one of disunity and disorganization.

End of Santa Anna's rule
Despite Santa Anna's role in the catastrophe of the Mexican–American War, he returned to power again. When the U.S. ambitioned an easier railroad route to California south of the Gila River, Santa Anna sold the Gadsden Strip to the US for $10 million in the Gadsden Purchase in 1853. This loss of more territory provoked outrage among Mexicans, but Santa Anna claimed that he needed money to rebuild the army from the war. In the end, he kept or squandered most of it. Liberals finally coalesced and successfully rebelled against his regime, promulgating the Plan of Ayutla in 1854 and forcing Santa Anna into exile. Liberals came to power and began enacting reforms that they had long envisioned.

Struggle between liberals and conservatives, 1855–1876

Liberals ousted conservative Santa Anna in the Plan of Ayutla and sought to implement liberal reforms in a series of separate laws, then in a new constitution, which incorporated them. Mexico experienced civil war and a foreign intervention that established a monarchy with the support of Mexican conservatives. The fall of the empire of Maximilian of Mexico and his execution in 1867 ushered in a period of relative peace, but economic stagnation during the Restored Republic. In general, the history writing on this era has characterized the liberals as forging a new, modern nation and conservatives as reactionary opponents of that vision. Starting in the late twentieth century, historians are writing more nuanced analyses of both liberals and conservatives.

Notable liberal politicians in the 1850s and 1860s include Benito Juárez, Juan Álvarez, Ignacio Comonfort, Miguel Lerdo de Tejada, Sebastián Lerdo de Tejada, Melchor Ocampo, José María Iglesias, Santiago Vidaurri, Manuel Doblado, and Santos Degollado. Prominent conservatives of the era were generals Félix Zuloaga, Miguel Miramón, Leonardo Márquez, Tomás Mejía, José Mariano Salas, as well as Juan N. Almonte, son of independence leader José María Morelos.

Plan of Ayutla
La Reforma began with the final overthrow of Santa Anna in the Plan of Ayutla in 1855. Moderate Liberal Ignacio Comonfort became president. The Moderados tried to find a middle ground between the nation's liberals and conservatives. There is less consensus about the ending point of the Reforma.

Common dates are 1861, after the liberal victory in the Reform War; 1867, after the republican victory over the French intervention in Mexico; and 1876 when Porfirio Díaz overthrew president Sebastián Lerdo de Tejada. Liberalism dominated Mexico as an intellectual force into the 20th century. Liberals championed reform and supported republicanism, capitalism, and individualism; they fought to reduce the Church's roles in education, land ownership and politics. Also importantly, liberals sought to end the special status of indigenous communities by ending their corporate ownership of land.

Constitution of 1857

Liberal Colonel Ignacio Comonfort became president in 1855 after a revolt based in Ayutla overthrew Santa Anna. Comonfort was a moderate who tried and failed to maintain an uncertain coalition of radical and moderate liberals. Radical liberals drafted the Constitution of 1857, which decreased the power of the executive, incorporated the laws of the Reform, and curtailed traditional powers of the Catholic Church. It granted religious freedom, stating only that the Catholic Church was the favored faith. The anti-clerical radicals scored a major victory with the ratification of the constitution, because it weakened the Church and enfranchised non property owning men. The constitution was oppossed by the army, the clergy and the other conservatives, as well as moderate liberals such as Comonfort. With the Plan of Tacubaya in December 1857, conservative General Félix Zuloaga led a coup in the capital in January 1858, creating a parallel government in Mexico City. Comonfort resigned the presidency and was succeeded by the President of the Supreme Court, Benito Juárez, who became President of the Republic, leading Mexican liberals.

War of Reform (1857–1861)
The revolt led to the War of Reform (December 1857 to January 1861), which grew increasingly bloody as it progressed and polarized the nation's politics. Many Moderates, convinced that the Church's political power had to be curbed, came over to the side of the Liberals.

For some time, the Liberals and Conservatives simultaneously administered separate governments, the Conservatives from Mexico City and the Liberals from Veracruz. The war ended with a Liberal victory, and liberal President Benito Juárez moved his administration to Mexico City.

French intervention and Second Mexican Empire (1861–1867)

In 1862, the country was invaded by France which sought to collect debts that the Juárez government had defaulted on, but the larger purpose was to install a ruler under French control. They chose a member of the Habsburg dynasty, which had ruled Spain and its overseas possessions until 1700. Archduke Ferdinand Maximilian of Austria was installed as Emperor Maximilian I of Mexico, with support from the Catholic Church, conservative elements of the upper class, and some indigenous communities. Although the French suffered an initial defeat (the Battle of Puebla on May 5, 1862, now commemorated as the Cinco de Mayo holiday), the French eventually defeated the Mexican army and set Maximilian on the throne. The Mexican-French monarchy set up administration in Mexico City, governing from the National Palace.

Maximilian's consort was Empress Carlota of Mexico and they chose Chapultepec Castle as their home. Maximilian has been praised by some historians for his liberal reforms, his desire to help the people of Mexico, and his refusal to desert his loyal followers. Some accused him of exploiting the nation's resources for themselves and their allies, including favoring the plans of Napoleon III to exploit the mines in the northwest of the country and to grow cotton.

Maximilian was a liberal, a fact that Mexican conservatives seemingly did not know when he was chosen to head the government. He favored the establishment of a limited monarchy that would share power with a democratically elected congress. This was too liberal for conservatives, while liberals refused to accept any monarch, considering the republican government of Benito Juárez as legitimate. This left Maximilian with few enthusiastic allies within Mexico. Meanwhile, Juárez remained head of the republican government. He continued to be recognized by the United States, which was engaged in its Civil War (1861–65) and at that juncture was in no position to aid Juárez directly against the French intervention until 1865.

France never made a profit in Mexico and its Mexican expedition grew increasingly unpopular. Finally in the spring of 1865, after the US Civil War was over, the US demanded the withdrawal of French troops from Mexico. Napoleon III quietly complied. In mid-1867, despite repeated Imperial losses in battle to the Republican Army and ever decreasing support from Napoleon III, Maximilian chose to remain in Mexico rather than return to Europe. He was captured and executed along with two Mexican supporters, immortalized in a famous painting by Édouard Manet. Juárez remained in office until his death in 1872.

Restored Republic (1867–1876)

 
In 1867 with the defeat of the monarchy and execution of Emperor Maximilian, the republic was restored and Juárez reelected. He continued to implement his reforms. In 1871, he was elected a second time, much to the dismay of his opponents within the Liberal party, who considered reelection to be somewhat undemocratic. Juárez died the following year and was succeeded by Sebastián Lerdo de Tejada.

Part of Juárez's reforms included fully secularizing the country. The Catholic Church was barred from owning property aside from houses of worship and monasteries, and education and marriage were put in the hands of the state.

Porfiriato (1876–1910)

The rule of Porfirio Díaz (1876–1911) was dedicated to the rule by law, suppression of violence, and modernization of the country. This period of relative prosperity is known as the Porfiriato. As traditional ways were under challenge, urban Mexicans debated national identity, the rejection of indigenous cultures, the new passion for French culture once the French were ousted from Mexico, and the challenge of creating a modern nation state through industrialization and scientific development. Díaz remained in power by rigging elections and censoring the press. Possible rivals were destroyed, and popular generals were moved to new areas so they could not build a permanent base of support. Banditry on roads leading to major cities was largely suppressed by the "Rurales", a police force controlled by Díaz. Banditry remained a major threat in more remote areas because the Rurales comprised fewer than 1000 men. Díaz was an astute military leader and liberal politician who built a national base of supporters. He maintained a stable relationship with the Catholic Church by avoiding the enforcement of constitutional anticlerical laws. The country's infrastructure was greatly improved through increased foreign investment from Britain and the US, and a strong, participatory central government. Increased tax revenue and better administration dramatically improved public safety, public health, railways, mining, industry, foreign trade, and national finances. Díaz modernized the army and suppressed some banditry. After a half-century of stagnation, where per capita income was merely a tenth of the developed nations such as Britain and the US, the Mexican economy took off and grew at an annual rate of 2.3% (1877 to 1910), which was high by world standards.

Order, progress, and dictatorship

Díaz reduced the Army from 30,000 to under 20,000 men, which resulted in a smaller percentage of the national budget being committed to the military. The army was modernized, well-trained, and equipped with some of the latest technology. The Army was top-heavy with 5,000 officers, many of them elderly, but politically well-connected veterans of the wars of the 1860s.

The political skills that Díaz used so effectively before 1900 faded, as he and his closest advisers were less open to negotiations with younger leaders. His announcement in 1908 that he would retire in 1911 unleashed a widespread feeling that Díaz was on the way out and that new coalitions had to be built. He nevertheless ran for reelection and in a show of U.S. support, Díaz and William Taft planned a summit in El Paso, Texas, and Ciudad Juárez, Mexico, for October 16, 1909, a historic first meeting between a Mexican and a U.S. president and also the first time an American president would cross the border into Mexico. Both sides agreed that the disputed Chamizal strip connecting El Paso to Ciudad Juárez would be considered neutral territory with no flags present during the summit, but the meeting focused attention on this territory and resulted in assassination threats and other serious security concerns. On the day of the summit, Frederick Russell Burnham, the celebrated scout, and Private C. R. Moore, a Texas Ranger, discovered a man holding a concealed palm pistol standing at the El Paso Chamber of Commerce building along the procession route. Burnham and Moore captured and disarmed the assassin within only a few feet of Díaz and Taft. Both presidents were unharmed and the summit was held. At the meeting, Díaz told John Hays Hammond, "Since I am responsible for bringing several billion dollars in foreign investments into my country, I think I should continue in my position until a competent successor is found." Díaz was re-elected after a highly controversial election, but he was overthrown in 1911 and forced into exile in France after Army units rebelled.

Economy

Fiscal stability was achieved by José Yves Limantour (1854–1935), Secretary of Finance of Mexico from 1893 until 1910. He was the leader of the well-educated technocrats known as Científicos, who were committed to modernity and sound finance. Limantour expanded foreign investment, supported free trade, balanced the budget for the first time, and generated a budget surplus by 1894. However, he was unable to halt the rising cost of food, which alienated the poor.

The American Panic of 1907 was an economic downturn that caused a sudden drop in demand for Mexican copper, silver, gold, zinc, and other metals. Mexico in turn cut its imports of horses and mules, mining machinery, and railroad supplies. The result was an economic depression in Mexico in 1908–1909 that soured optimism and raised discontent with the Díaz regime.

Mexico was vulnerable to external shocks because of its weak banking system. The banking system was controlled by a small oligarchy, which typically made long-term loans to its directors. The banks were the financial arms of extended kinship-based business coalitions that used banks to raise additional capital to expand enterprises. Economic growth was largely based on trade with the United States.

Mexico had few factories by 1880, but then industrialization took hold in the Northeast, especially in Monterrey. Factories produced machinery, textiles, and beer, while smelters processed ores. Convenient rail links with the nearby US gave local entrepreneurs from seven wealthy merchant families a competitive advantage over more distant cities. New federal laws in 1884 and 1887 allowed corporations to be more flexible. By the 1920s, American Smelting and Refining Company (ASARCO), an American firm controlled by the Guggenheim family, had invested over 20 million pesos and employed nearly 2,000 workers smelting copper and making wire to meet the demand for electrical wiring in the US and Mexico.

Modernity

The modernizers insisted that public schools and secular education lead the way, and that science should replace religious schooling by the Catholic Church. They reformed elementary schools by mandating uniformity, secularization, and rationality. These reforms were consistent with international trends in teaching methods. To break the traditional peasant habits that were seen to hinder industrialization, reforms emphasized children's punctuality, assiduity, and health. In 1910, the National University was opened as an elite school for the next generation of leaders.

Cities were rebuilt with modernizing architects favoring the latest western European styles, especially the Beaux-Arts style, to symbolize the break with the past. A highly visible exemplar was the Federal Legislative Palace, built 1897–1910.

Rural unrest
Historian John Tutino examines the impact of the Porfiriato in the highland basins south of Mexico City, which became the Zapatista heartland during the Revolution. Population growth, railways, and concentration of land in a few families generated a commercial expansion that undercut the traditional powers of the villagers. Young men felt insecure about the patriarchal roles they had expected to fill. Initially, this anxiety manifested as violence within families and communities. But, after the defeat of Díaz in 1910, villagers expressed their rage in revolutionary assaults on local elites who had profited most from the Porfiriato. The young men were radicalized, as they fought for their traditional roles regarding land, community, and patriarchy.

Revolution of 1910–1920

The Mexican Revolution is a broad term to describe political and social changes in the early 20th century. Most scholars consider it to span the years 1910–1920, from the fraudulent election of Porfirio Díaz in 1910 until the December 1920 election of general Alvaro Obregón. Foreign powers had important economic and strategic interests in the outcome of power struggles in Mexico, with the United States' involvement in the Mexican Revolution playing an especially significant role.

The Revolution grew increasingly broad-based, radical, and violent. Revolutionaries sought far-reaching social and economic reforms by strengthening the state and weakening the conservative forces represented by the Church, rich landowners, and foreign capitalists.

Some scholars consider the promulgation of the Mexican Constitution of 1917 as the revolution's endpoint. "Economic and social conditions improved in accordance with revolutionary policies, so that the new society took shape within a framework of official revolutionary institutions," with the constitution providing that framework. Organized labor gained significant power, as seen in Article 123 of the Constitution of 1917. Land reform in Mexico was enabled by Article 27. Economic nationalism was also enabled by Article 27, restricting ownership of enterprises by foreigners. The Constitution also further restricted the Roman Catholic Church in Mexico; implementing the restrictions in the late 1920s resulted in the Cristero War. A ban on the re-election of the president was enshrined in the Constitution and practice. Political succession was achieved in 1929 with the creation of the Partido Nacional Revolucionario (PNR), the political party that dominated Mexico's politics for the remainder of the 20th century, now called the Institutional Revolutionary Party.

One major effect of the revolution was the disappearance of the Federal Army in 1914, defeated by revolutionary forces of the various factions in the Mexican Revolution. The Mexican Revolution was based on popular participation. At first, it was based on the peasantry who demanded land, water, and a more representative national government. Wasserman finds that:
"Popular participation in the revolution and its aftermath took three forms. First, everyday people, though often in conjunction with elite neighbors, generated local issues such as access to land, taxes, and village autonomy. Second, the popular classes provided soldiers to fight in the revolution. Third, local issues advocated by campesinos and workers framed national discourses on land reform, the role of religion, and many other questions."

Election of 1910 and popular rebellion

Porfirio Díaz announced in an interview to a US journalist James Creelman that he would not run for president in 1910, at which point he would be 80 years old. This set off a spate of political activity by potential candidates, including Francisco I. Madero, a member of one of Mexico's richest families. Madero was part of the Anti-Reelectionist Party, whose main platform was the end of the Díaz regime. But Díaz reversed his decision to retire and ran again. He created the office of vice president, which could have been a mechanism to ease presidential transition. But Díaz chose a politically unpalatable running mate, Ramón Corral, over a popular military man, Bernardo Reyes, and a popular civilian Francisco I. Madero. He sent Reyes on a "study mission" to Europe and jailed Madero. Official election results declared that Díaz had won almost unanimously and Madero received only a few hundred votes. This fraud was too blatant, and riots broke out. Uprisings against Díaz occurred in the fall of 1910, particularly in Mexico's north and the southern state of Morelos. Helping unite opposition forces was a political plan drafted by Madero, the Plan of San Luis Potosí, in which he called on the Mexican people to take up arms and fight against the Díaz government. The rising was set for November 20, 1910. Madero escaped from prison to San Antonio, Texas, where he began preparing to overthrow Díaz—an action today considered the start of the Mexican Revolution. Díaz tried to use the army to suppress the revolts, but most of the ranking generals were old men close to his own age and they did not act swiftly or with sufficient energy to stem the violence. Revolutionary force—led by, among others, Emiliano Zapata in the South, Pancho Villa and Pascual Orozco in the North, and Venustiano Carranza—defeated the Federal Army.

Díaz resigned in May 1911 for the "sake of the peace of the nation". The terms of his resignation were spelled out in the Treaty of Ciudad Juárez, but it also called for an interim presidency and new elections were to be held. Francisco León de la Barra served as interim president. The Federal Army, although defeated by the northern revolutionaries, was kept intact. Francisco I. Madero, whose 1910 Plan of San Luis Potosí had helped mobilize forces opposed to Díaz, accepted the political settlement. He campaigned in the presidential elections of October 1911, won decisively, and was inaugurated in November 1911.

Madero presidency and its opposition, 1911–1913
 

Following the resignation of Díaz and a brief interim presidency of a high-level government official from the Díaz era, Madero was elected president in 1911.

The revolutionary leaders had many different objectives; revolutionary figures varied from liberals such as Madero to radicals such as Emiliano Zapata and Pancho Villa. As a consequence, it proved impossible to agree on how to organize the government that emerged from the triumphant first phase of the revolution. This standoff over political principles led quickly to a struggle for control of the government, a violent conflict that lasted more than 20 years.

Counter-revolution and civil war, 1913–1915

Madero was ousted and killed in February 1913 during the Ten Tragic Days. General Victoriano Huerta, one of Díaz's former generals, and a nephew of Díaz, Félix Díaz, plotted with the US ambassador to Mexico, Henry Lane Wilson, to topple Madero and reassert the policies of Díaz.

Within a month of the coup, rebellions started spreading in Mexico, most prominently by the governor of the state of Coahuila, Venustiano Carranza along with old revolutionaries demobilized by Madero, such as Pancho Villa. The northern revolutionaries fought under the name of the Constitutionalist Army, with Carranza as the "First Chief" (primer jefe).

In the south, Emiliano Zapata continued his rebellion in Morelos under the Plan of Ayala, calling for the expropriation of land and redistribution to peasants. Huerta offered peace to Zapata, who rejected it.

Huerta convinced Pascual Orozco, whom he fought while serving the Madero government, to join Huerta's forces. Supporting the Huerta regime were business interests in Mexico, both foreign and domestic; landed elites; the Roman Catholic Church; as well as the German and British governments. The Federal Army became an arm of the Huerta regime, swelling to some 200,000 men, many pressed into service and most ill-trained.

The US did not recognize the Huerta government, but from February to August 1913 it imposed an arms embargo on exports to Mexico, exempting the Huerta government and thereby favoring the regime against emerging revolutionary forces. However, President Woodrow Wilson sent a special envoy to Mexico to assess the situation, and reports on the many rebellions in Mexico convinced Wilson that Huerta was unable to maintain order. Arms ceased to flow to Huerta's government, which benefited the revolutionary cause.

The US Navy made an incursion on the Gulf Coast, occupying Veracruz in April 1914. Although Mexico was engaged in a civil war at the time, the US intervention united Mexican forces in their opposition to the US. Foreign powers helped broker US withdrawal in the Niagara Falls peace conference. The US timed its pullout to throw its support to the Constitutionalist faction under Carranza.

Initially, the forces in northern Mexico were united under the Constitutionalist banner, with able revolutionary generals serving the civilian First Chief Carranza. Pancho Villa began to split from supporting Carranza as Huerta was on his way out. The break was not simply on personalist grounds, but primarily because Carranza was politically too conservative for Villa. Carranza was not only a political holdover from the Díaz era, but was also a rich hacienda owner whose interests were threatened by the more radical ideas of Villa, especially on land reform. Zapata in the south was also hostile to Carranza due to his stance on land reform.

In July 1914, Huerta resigned under pressure and went into exile. His resignation marked the end of an era since the Federal Army, a spectacularly ineffective fighting force against the revolutionaries, ceased to exist.

With the exit of Huerta, the revolutionary factions decided to meet and make "a last-ditch effort to avert more intense warfare than that which unseated Huerta." Called to meet in Mexico City in October 1914, revolutionaries opposed to Carranza's influence successfully moved the venue to Aguascalientes. The Convention of Aguascalientes did not reconcile the various victorious factions in the Mexican Revolution but was a brief pause in revolutionary violence. The break between Carranza and Villa became definitive during the convention. Rather than First Chief Carranza being named president of Mexico, General Eulalio Gutiérrez was chosen. Carranza and Obregón left Aguascalientes, with far smaller forces than Villa's. The convention declared Carranza in rebellion against it and civil war resumed, this time between revolutionary armies that had fought for a united cause to oust Huerta.

Villa went into alliance with Zapata to form the Army of the convention. Their forces separately moved on to the capital and captured Mexico City in 1914, which Carranza's forces had abandoned. The famous picture of Villa, sitting in the presidential chair in the National Palace, and Zapata is a classic image of the Revolution. Villa is reported to have said to Zapata that the presidential "chair is too big for us." The alliance between Villa and Zapata did not function in practice beyond this initial victory against the Constitutionalists. Zapata returned to his southern stronghold in Morelos, where he continued to engage in guerrilla warfare under the Plan of Ayala. Villa prepared to win a decisive victory against the Constitutionalist Army under Obregón.

The two rival armies of Villa and Obregón met on April 6–15, 1915 in the Battle of Celaya. The frontal cavalry charges of Villa's forces were met by the shrewd, modern military tactics of Obregón. The Constitutionalist victory was complete. Carranza emerged in 1915 as the political leader of Mexico with a victorious army to keep him in that position. Villa retreated north, seemingly into political oblivion. Carranza and the Constitutionalists consolidated their position as the winning faction, with Zapata remaining a threat until his assassination in 1919.

Constitutionalists in power, 1915–1920

Venustiano Carranza promulgated a new constitution on February 5, 1917. The Mexican Constitution of 1917, with significant amendments in the 1990s, still governs Mexico.

On 19 January 1917, a secret message (the Zimmermann Telegram) was sent from the German foreign minister to Mexico proposing joint military action against the United States if war broke out. The offer included material aid to Mexico to reclaim the territory lost during the Mexican–American War, specifically the American states of Texas, New Mexico, and Arizona. Carranza's generals told him that Mexico would lose to its much more powerful neighbor. Zimmermann's message was intercepted and published, causing outrage in the US and catalyzing an American declaration of war against Germany in early April. Carranza then formally rejected the offer, and the threat of war with the US eased.

Carranza was assassinated in 1920 during an internal feud among his former supporters over who would replace him as president.

Consolidation of revolution, 1920–1940

Northern revolutionary generals as presidents

Three Sonoran generals of the Constitutionalist Army, Álvaro Obregón, Plutarco Elías Calles, and Adolfo de la Huerta dominated Mexico in the 1920s. Their life experience in Mexico's northwest, described as a "savage pragmatism" was in a sparsely settled region, conflict with Natives, secular rather than religious culture, and independent, commercially oriented ranchers and farmers. This was different from subsistence agriculture of the dense population of the strongly Catholic indigenous and mestizo peasantry of central Mexico. Obregón was the dominant member of the triumvirate, as the leading general in the Constitutionalist Army, who had defeated Pancho Villa in battle. All three were also skilled politicians and administrators. In Sonora they had "formed their own professional army, patronized and allied themselves with labor unions, and expanded the government authority to promote economic development." Once in power, they scaled this up to the national level.

Obregón presidency, 1920–1924

Obregón, Calles, and de la Huerta revolted against Carranza in the Plan of Agua Prieta in 1920. Following the interim presidency of Adolfo de la Huerta, elections were held and Obregón was elected for a four-year presidential term. As well as being the Constitutionalists' most brilliant general, Obregón was a clever politician and successful businessman. His government managed to accommodate many elements of Mexican society except the most conservative clergy and wealthy landowners. He was a revolutionary nationalist, holding seemingly contradictory views as a socialist, a capitalist, a Jacobin, a spiritualist, and an Americanophile. 

He was able to successfully implement policies emerging from the revolutionary struggle; in particular, the successful policies were: the integration of urban, organized labor into political life via CROM, the improvement of education and Mexican cultural production under José Vasconcelos, the movement of land reform, and the steps taken toward instituting women's civil rights. He faced several main tasks in the presidency, mainly political in nature. First was consolidating state power in the central government and curbing regional strongmen (caudillos); second was obtaining diplomatic recognition from the United States; and third was managing the presidential succession in 1924 when his term of office ended. His administration began constructing what one scholar called "an enlightened despotism, a ruling conviction that the state knew what ought to be done and needed plenary powers to fulfill its mission." After the nearly decade-long violence of the Mexican Revolution, reconstruction in the hands of a strong central government offered stability and a path of renewed modernization.

Obregón knew his regime needed to secure the recognition of the United States. With the promulgation of the Mexican Constitution of 1917, the Mexican government was empowered to expropriate natural resources. The U.S. had considerable business interests in Mexico, especially oil, and the threat of Mexican economic nationalism to big oil companies meant that diplomatic recognition could hinge on Mexican compromise in implementing the constitution. In 1923 when the Mexican presidential elections were on the horizon, Obregón began negotiating with the U.S. government in earnest, with the two governments signing the Bucareli Treaty. The treaty resolved questions about foreign oil interests in Mexico, largely in favor of U.S. interests, but Obregón's government gained U.S. diplomatic recognition. With that arms and ammunition began flowing to revolutionary armies loyal to Obregón.

Since Obregón had named his fellow Sonoran general, Plutarco Elías Calles, as his successor, Obregón was imposing a "little known nationally and unpopular with many generals," thereby foreclosing the ambitions of fellow revolutionaries, particularly his old comrade Adolfo de la Huerta. De la Huerta staged a serious rebellion against Obregón. But Obregón once again demonstrated his brilliance as a military tactician who now had arms and even air support from the United States to suppress it brutally. Fifty-four former Obregonistas were shot in the event. Vasconcelos resigned from Obregón's cabinet as minister of education.

Although the Constitution of 1917 had stronger anticlerical articles than the previous constitution, Obregón largely sidestepped confrontation with the Roman Catholic Church in Mexico. Since political opposition parties were essentially banned, the Catholic Church "filled the political void and play the part of a substitute opposition."

Calles presidency, 1924–1928

The 1924 presidential election was not a demonstration of free and fair elections, but the incumbent Obregón could not stand for re-election, thereby acknowledging that revolutionary principle. He completed his presidential term still alive, the first since Porfirio Díaz. Candidate Plutarco Elías Calles embarked on one of the first populist presidential campaigns in the nation's history, calling for land reform and promising equal justice, more education, additional labor rights, and democratic governance. Calles tried to fulfill his promises during his populist phase (1924–26), and a repressive anti-clerical phase (1926–28). Obregón's stance toward the church appears pragmatic, since there were many other issues for him to deal with, but his successor Calles, a vehement anticlerical, took on the church as an institution and religious Catholics when he succeeded to the presidency, bringing about violent, bloody, and protracted conflict known as the Cristero War.

Cristero War (1926–1929)

The Cristero War of 1926 to 1929 was a counter-revolution against the Calles regime set off by his persecution of the Catholic Church in Mexico and specifically the strict enforcement of the anti-clerical provisions of the Mexican Constitution of 1917 and the expansion of further anti-clerical laws.

Some articles of the Constitution were at issue: a) Article 5 (outlawing monastic religious orders); b) Article 24 (forbidding public worship outside of church buildings); c) Article 27 (restricting religious organizations' rights to own property); d) Article 130 (took away civil rights of the clergy: priests and religious leaders were prevented from wearing their habits, were denied the right to vote, and were not permitted to comment on public affairs in the press).

The formal rebellions began early in 1927, with the rebels calling themselves Cristeros because they felt they were fighting for Jesus Christ himself. The laity stepped into the vacuum created by the removal of priests, and in the long run, the Church was strengthened. The Cristero War was resolved diplomatically, largely with the help of the U.S. Ambassador, Dwight Morrow.

The conflict claimed about 250,000 lives, including civilians and Cristeros killed during raids after the war's end. As promised in the diplomatic resolution, the anti-clerical laws remained on the books, but the federal government made no organized attempt to enforce them. Nonetheless, persecution of Catholic priests continued in several localities, fueled by local officials' interpretation of the resolutions.

Maximato and the Formation of the ruling party 

After the presidential term of Calles, which ended in 1928, former president Alvaro Obregón won the presidency, but he was assassinated immediately after the July election leaving a power vacuum. Outgoing President Calles could not immediately stand for election, so there needed to be a solution to the crisis. Revolutionary generals and others in the power elite agreed that congress should appoint an interim president and new elections were held in 1928. In his final address to congress on 1 September 1928, President Calles declared the end of strongman rule, a ban on Mexican presidents serving again in that office, and that Mexico was now entering an age of rule by institutions and laws. Congress chose Emilio Portes Gil to serve as interim president, but Calles remained the power behind the presidency until ousted by Lázaro Cárdenas in 1936.

Calles created a more permanent solution to presidential succession with the founding of the National Revolutionary Party (PNR) in 1929. It was a national party that was a permanent rather than a local and ephemeral institution. Calles became the power behind the presidency in this period, known as the Maximato, named after his title of jefe máximo (maximum leader). The party brought together regional caudillos and integrated labor organizations and peasant leagues in a party that was better able to manage the political process. For the six-year term that Obregón was to serve, three presidents held office, Emilio Portes Gil, Pascual Ortiz Rubio, and Abelardo L. Rodríguez, with Calles the power behind the presidency. In 1934, the PNR chose Calles-supporter Lázaro Cárdenas, a revolutionary general, who had a political power base in Michoacan, as the candidate of the PNR for the Mexican presidency. After an initial period of acquiescence to Calles's role in intervening in the presidency, Cárdenas out-maneuvered his former patron and eventually sent him into exile. Cárdenas reformed the PNR structure, resulting in the creation of the PRM (Partido Revolucionario Mexicano), the Mexican Revolutionary Party, which included the army as a party sector. He had convinced most of the remaining revolutionary generals to hand over their personal armies to the Mexican Army; the date of the PRM party's foundation is thus considered by some to be the end of the Revolution. The party was re-structured again in 1946 and renamed the Institutional Revolutionary Party (PRI) and held power continuously until 2000. After its establishment as the ruling party, the PRI monopolized all the political branches: it did not lose a senate seat until 1988 or a gubernatorial race until 1989. It was not until July 2, 2000, that Vicente Fox of the opposition "Alliance for Change" coalition, headed by the National Action Party (PAN), was elected president. His victory ended the PRI's 71-year hold on the presidency.

Revitalization of the revolution under Cárdenas 

Lázaro Cárdenas was hand-picked by Calles as the successor to the presidency in 1934. Cárdenas managed to unite the different forces in the PRI and set the rules that allowed his party to rule unchallenged for decades to come without internal fights. He nationalized the oil industry (on 18 March 1938), and the electricity industry, created the National Polytechnic Institute and implemented extensive land reform and the distribution of free textbooks to children. In 1936 he exiled Calles, the last general with dictatorial ambitions, thereby removing the army from power.

On the eve of World War II, the Cárdenas administration (1934–1940) was just stabilizing, and consolidating control over, a Mexican nation that, for decades, had been in revolutionary flux, and Mexicans were beginning to interpret the European battle between the communists and fascists, especially the Spanish Civil War, through their unique revolutionary lens. Whether Mexico would side with the United States was unclear during Lázaro Cárdenas' rule, as he remained neutral. "Capitalists, businessmen, Catholics, and middle-class Mexicans who opposed many of the reforms implemented by the revolutionary government sided with the Spanish Falange".

Nazi propagandist Arthur Dietrich and his team of agents in Mexico successfully manipulated editorials and coverage of Europe by paying hefty subsidies to Mexican newspapers, including the widely read dailies Excélsior and El Universal. The situation became even more worrisome for the Allies when major oil companies boycotted Mexican oil following Lázaro Cárdenas' nationalization of the oil industry and expropriation of all corporate oil properties in 1938, which severed Mexico's access to its traditional markets and led Mexico to sell its oil to Germany and Italy.

"Revolution to evolution", 1940–1970
Most historians consider 1940 a major dividing line between the era of military violence and then political consolidation by military leaders of the Revolution and a post-1940 prolonged period of political stability and economic growth.

Manuel Ávila Camacho presidency and World War II 

Manuel Ávila Camacho, Cárdenas's successor, presided over a "bridge" between the revolutionary era and the era of machine politics under PRI that lasted until 2000. Ávila Camacho, moving away from nationalistic autarchy, proposed to create a favorable climate for international investment, which had been a policy favored nearly two generations earlier by Madero. Ávila's regime froze wages, repressed strikes, and persecuted dissidents with a law prohibiting the "crime of social dissolution." During this period, the PRI shifted to the right and abandoned much of the radical nationalism of the Cárdenas era. Miguel Alemán Valdés, Ávila Camacho's successor, amended Article 27 to limit land reform, protecting large landowners.

Mexico played a relatively minor military role in World War II, but there were other opportunities for Mexico to contribute significantly. Relations between Mexico and the U.S. had been warming in the 1930s, particularly after U.S. President Franklin Delano Roosevelt implemented the Good Neighbor Policy toward Latin American countries. Even before the outbreak of hostilities between the Axis and Allied powers, Mexico aligned itself firmly with the United States, initially as a proponent of "belligerent neutrality" which the U.S. followed before the Attack on Pearl Harbor in December 1941. Mexico sanctioned businesses and individuals identified by the U.S. government as being supporters of the Axis powers; in August 1941, Mexico broke off economic ties with Germany, then recalled its diplomats from Germany, and closed the German consulates in Mexico. The Confederation of Mexican Workers (CTM) and the Confederation of Mexican Peasants (CNC) staged massive rallies in support of the government. Immediately following the Japanese attack on Pearl Harbor on December 7, 1941, Mexico went on a war footing.

Mexico's biggest contributions to the war effort were in vital war materiel and labor, particularly the Bracero Program, a guest-worker program in the U.S. freeing men there to fight in the European and Pacific theaters of War. There was heavy demand for its exports, which created a degree of prosperity. A Mexican atomic scientist, José Rafael Bejarano, worked on the secret Manhattan Project that developed the atomic bomb.

In Mexico and throughout Latin America, Roosevelt's "Good Neighbor Policy" was necessary at such a delicate time. Much work had already been accomplished between the U.S. and Mexico to create more harmonious relations between the two countries, including the settlement of U.S. citizen claims against the Mexican government, initially and ineffectively negotiated by the binational American-Mexican Claims Commission, but then in direct bilateral negotiations between the two governments. The U.S. government did not intervene on behalf of U.S. oil companies during the Mexican oil expropriation, allowing Mexico to assert its economic sovereignty but also benefiting the U.S. by easing antagonism in Mexico. The Good Neighbor Policy led to the Douglas-Weichers Agreement in June 1941 that secured the sale of Mexican oil to the United States, and the Global Settlement in November 1941 that ended oil company demands on generous terms for the Mexicans, an example of the U.S. putting national security concerns over the interests of U.S. oil companies. When it became clear in other parts of Latin America that the U.S. and Mexico had substantially resolved their differences, the other Latin American countries were more amenable to support the U.S. and Allied efforts against the Axis.

Following losses of oil ships in the Gulf (the Potrero del Llano and Faja de Oro) to German submarines (U-564 and U-106 respectively) the Mexican government declared war on the Axis powers on May 30, 1942.

Perhaps the most famous fighting unit in the Mexican Armed Forces was the Escuadrón 201, also known as the Aztec Eagles. The unit consisted of more than 300 volunteers, who had trained in the United States to fight against Japan in the Pacific War. The Escuadrón 201 was the first Mexican military unit trained for overseas combat, and fought during the liberation of the Philippines, working with the U.S. Fifth Air Force in the last year of the war.

Although most Latin American countries eventually entered the war on the Allies' side, Mexico and Brazil were the only Latin American nations that sent troops to fight overseas during World War II.

With so many draftees, the U.S. needed farm workers. The Bracero Program allowed 290,000 Mexicans to work temporarily on American farms, especially in Texas.

Economic "miracle" (1940–1970)

During the next four decades, Mexico experienced high rates of economic growth, an achievement some historians call "El Milagro Mexicano", the Mexican Miracle. A key component of this phenomenon was the achievement of political stability, which since the founding of the dominant party, has insured stable presidential succession and control of potentially dissident labor and peasant sections through participation in the party structure. In 1938, Lázaro Cárdenas used Article 27 of the Constitution of 1917, which gave subsoil rights to the Mexican government, to expropriate foreign oil companies. It was a popular move, but it did not generate further major expropriations. With Cárdenas's hand-picked successor, Manuel Avila Camacho, Mexico moved closer to the U.S., as an ally in World War II. This alliance brought significant economic gains to Mexico. By supplying raw and finished war materials to the Allies, Mexico built up significant assets that in the post-war period could be translated into sustained growth and industrialization. After 1946, the government took a rightward turn under President Miguel Alemán, who repudiated the policies of previous presidents. Mexico pursued industrial development, through import substitution industrialization and tariffs against imports. Mexican industrialists, including a group in Monterrey, Nuevo León as well as wealthy businessmen in Mexico City joined Alemán's coalition. Alemán tamed the labor movement in favor of policies supporting industrialists.

Financing industrialization came from private entrepreneurs, such as the Monterrey group, but the government funded a significant amount through its development bank, Nacional Financiera. Foreign capital through direct investment was another source of funding for industrialization, much of it from the United States. Government policies transferred economic benefits from the countryside to the city by keeping agricultural prices artificially low, which made food cheap for city-dwelling industrial workers and other urban consumers. Commercial agriculture expanded with the growth of exports to the U.S. of high-value fruits and vegetables, with rural credit going to large producers, not peasant agriculture. In particular, the creation of high-yield seeds during the Green Revolution aimed at expanding commercially oriented, highly mechanized agribusiness.

Guatemala conflict
The Mexico–Guatemala conflict was an armed conflict with Guatemala, in which civilian fishing boats were fired upon by the Guatemalan Air Force. Hostilities were set in motion by the installation of Miguel Ydígoras as President of Guatemala on March 2, 1958.

1970–1994

Economic crises of 1976 and 1982
Although PRI administrations achieved economic growth and relative prosperity for almost three decades after World War II, the party's management of the economy led to several crises. Political unrest grew in the late 1960s, culminating in the Tlatelolco massacre in 1968. Economic crises swept the country in 1976 and 1982, leading to the nationalization of Mexico's banks, which were blamed for economic problems (La Década Perdida).

On both occasions, the Mexican peso was devalued, and, until 2000, it was normal to expect a big devaluation and recession at the end of each presidential term. The "December Mistake" crisis threw Mexico into economic turmoil—the worst recession in over half a century.

1985 earthquake 

On 19 September 1985, an earthquake (8.1 on the Richter scale) struck Michoacán, inflicting severe damage on Mexico City. Estimates of the number of dead range from 6,500 to 30,000. Public anger at the PRI's mishandling of relief efforts combined with the ongoing economic crisis led to a substantial weakening of the PRI. As a result, for the first time since the 1930s, the PRI began to face serious electoral challenges.

Changing political landscape 1970–1990
A phenomenon of the 1980s was the growth of organized political opposition to de facto one-party rule by the PRI. The National Action Party (PAN), founded in 1939 and until the 1980s a marginal political party and not a serious contender for power, began to gain voters, particularly in Northern Mexico. They made gains in local elections initially, but in 1986 the PAN candidate for the governorship of Chihuahua had a good chance of winning. The Catholic Church was constitutionally forbidden from participating in electoral politics, but the archbishop urged voters not to abstain from the elections. The PRI intervened and upended what would likely have been a victory for the PRI. Although the PRI's candidate became governor, the widespread perception of electoral fraud, criticism by the archbishop of Chihuahua, and a more mobilized electorate made the victory costly to the PRI.

1988 Presidential election
The 1988 Mexican general election was extremely important in Mexican history. The PRI's candidate, Carlos Salinas de Gortari, an economist who was educated at Harvard, had never held an elected office, and was a technocrat with no direct link to the legacy of the Mexican Revolution even through his family. Rather than toe the party line, Cuauhtemoc Cárdenas, the son of former President Lázaro Cárdenas, broke with the PRI and ran as a candidate of the Democratic Current, later forming the Party of the Democratic Revolution (PRD). The PAN candidate Manuel Clouthier ran a clean campaign the in long-standing pattern of the party.

The election was marked by irregularities on a massive scale. The Ministry of the Interior (Gobernación) controlled the electoral process; in practice, the PRI controlled it in its favor. During the vote count, the government computers were said to have crashed, something the government called "a breakdown of the system". One observer said, "For the ordinary citizen, it was not the computer network but the Mexican political system that had crashed." When the computers were said to be running again after a considerable delay, the election results they recorded were an extremely narrow victory for Salinas (50.7%), Cárdenas (31.1%), and Clouthier (16.8%). Cárdenas was widely seen to have won the election, but Salinas was declared the winner. There might have been violence in the wake of such fraudulent results, but Cárdenas did not call for it, "sparing the country a possible civil war." Years later, former Mexican President Miguel de la Madrid (1982–88) was quoted in The New York Times stating that the results were indeed fraudulent.

Contemporary Mexico

President Ernesto Zedillo (1994–2000) 
 
In 1995, President Ernesto Zedillo faced the Mexican peso crisis. There were public demonstrations in Mexico City and a constant military presence after the 1994 rising of the Zapatista Army of National Liberation in Chiapas.

The United States intervened rapidly to stem the economic crisis, first by buying pesos in the open market, and then by granting assistance in the form of $50 billion in loan guarantees. The peso stabilized at 6 pesos per dollar. By 1996, the economy was growing, and in 1997, Mexico repaid, ahead of schedule, all U.S. Treasury loans.

Zedillo oversaw political and electoral reforms that reduced the PRI's hold on power. After the 1988 election, which was strongly disputed and arguably lost by the government, the IFE (Instituto Federal Electoral – Federal Electoral Institute) was created in the early 1990s. The IFE oversees elections with the aim of ensuring that they are conducted legally and impartially.

NAFTA and USMCA (1994–present)

On 1 January 1994, Mexico became a full member of the North American Free Trade Agreement (NAFTA), joining the United States and Canada.

Mexico has a free market economy that entered the Trillion dollar club in 2010. It contains a mixture of modern and outmoded industry and agriculture, increasingly dominated by the private sector. Recent administrations have expanded competition in sea ports, railroads, telecommunications, electricity generation, natural gas distribution, and airports.

Per capita income is one-quarter that of the United States; income distribution remains highly unequal. Trade with the United States and Canada has tripled since the implementation of NAFTA. Mexico has free-trade agreements with more than 40 countries, governing 90% of its foreign commerce.

End of PRI rule in 2000
Accused many times of electoral fraud, the PRI held almost all public offices until the end of the 20th century. Not until the 1980s did the PRI lose its first state governorship, an event that marked the beginning of the party's loss of hegemony.

President Vicente Fox Quesada (2000–2006)

Emphasizing the need to upgrade infrastructure, modernize the tax system and labor laws, integrate with the U.S. economy, and allow private investment in the energy sector, Vicente Fox Quesada, the candidate of the National Action Party (PAN), was elected the 69th president of Mexico on 2 July 2000, ending PRI's 71-year-long control of the office. Though Fox's victory was due in part to popular discontent with decades of unchallenged PRI hegemony, also, Fox's opponent, president Zedillo, conceded defeat on the night of the election—a first in Mexican history. A further sign of the quickening of Mexican democracy was the fact that PAN failed to win a majority in both chambers of Congress—a situation that prevented Fox from implementing his reform pledges. Nonetheless, the transfer of power in 2000 was quick and peaceful.

Fox was a very strong candidate, but an ineffective president who was weakened by PAN's minority status in Congress. Historian Philip Russell summarizes the strengths and weaknesses of Fox as president:
Marketed on television, Fox made a far better candidate than he did president. He failed to take charge and provide cabinet leadership, failed to set priorities, and turned a blind eye to alliance building... By 2006, political scientist Soledad Loaeza noted, "the eager candidate became a reluctant president who avoided tough choices and appeared hesitant and unable to hide the weariness caused by the responsibilities and constraints of the office." ...He had little success in fighting crime. Even though he maintained the macroeconomic stability inherited from his predecessor, economic growth barely exceeded the rate of population increase. Similarly, the lack of fiscal reform left tax collection at a rate similar to that of Haiti... Finally, during Fox's administration, only 1.4 million formal-sector jobs were created, leading to massive immigration to the United States and an explosive increase in informal employment.

President Felipe Calderón Hinojosa (2006–2012)

President Felipe Calderón Hinojosa (PAN) took office after one of the most hotly contested elections in recent Mexican history; Calderón won by such a small margin (.56% or 233,831 votes.) that the runner-up, Andrés Manuel López Obrador of the leftist Party of the Democratic Revolution (PRD) contested the results.

Despite establishing a cap on the salaries of high-ranking public servants, Calderón ordered a raise on the salaries of the Federal Police and the Mexican Armed Forces on his first day as president.

Calderón's government ordered massive raids on drug cartels upon assuming office in December 2006 in response to an increase in cartel violence in his home state of Michoacán. The decision to intensify drug enforcement operations has led to an ongoing conflict between the federal government and the Mexican drug cartels.

Drug war (2006-present)

Under President Calderón (2006-2012), the government began waging a war on regional drug mafias. So far, this conflict has resulted in the deaths of tens of thousands of Mexicans and the drug mafias continue to gain power. Mexico has been a major transit and drug-producing nation: an estimated 90% of the cocaine smuggled into the United States every year passes through Mexico. Fueled by the increasing demand for drugs in the United States, the country has become a major supplier of heroin, producer, and distributor of MDMA, and the largest foreign supplier of cannabis and methamphetamine to the U.S. market. Major drug syndicates control the majority of drug trafficking in the country, and Mexico is a significant money-laundering center.

After the Federal Assault Weapons Ban expired in the U.S. on September 13, 2004, Mexican drug cartels have begun acquiring assault weapons in the United States. The result is that drug cartels have now both more gun power, and more manpower due to the high unemployment in Mexico.

After taking office in 2018, President Andrés Manuel López Obrador pursued an alternative approach to dealing with drug mafias, calling for a policy of "hugs, not gunshots" (Abrazos, no balazos). This policy has been ineffective, and the death toll has not decreased. In October 2019, AMLO's government released drug lord Ovidio Guzmán López during the Battle of Culiacán as part of ceasefire negotiations.

Former Secretary of Defense Salvador Cienfuegos was arrested by U.S. officials on 15 October 2020 at Los Angeles International Airport on drug and money-laundering charges. He was found to have used the alias "El Padrino" ("The Godfather") while working with the H-2 Cartel. The Mexican government warned of reviewing security agreements with the United States over not being given advance notice of the arrest.

On 18 November 2020, American authorities agreed to drop charges against Cienfuegos. They also agreed to send him back to Mexico, where he is under investigation. Some American media outlets reported that the charges had been dropped under pressure from the Mexican federal government, which had threatened to expel DEA agents from the country. The President of Mexico Andrés Manuel López Obrador, however, has denied the acussation.

President Enrique Peña Nieto (2012–2018)

On July 1, 2012, Enrique Peña Nieto was elected president of Mexico with 38% of the vote. He is a former governor of the state of Mexico and a member of the PRI. His election returned the PRI to power after 12 years of PAN rule. He was officially sworn into office on December 1, 2012.

The Pacto por México was a cross-party alliance that called for the accomplishment of 95 goals. It was signed on 2 December 2012 by the leaders of the three main political parties in Chapultepec Castle. The Pact was lauded by some international pundits as an example of solving political gridlock and effectively passing institutional reforms. Among other legislation, it called for education reform, banking reform, fiscal reform and telecommunications reform, all of which were eventually passed. However, this pact was ultimately jeopardized when the center-right PAN and PRI pushed for a revaluation of, and end to, the monopoly of the state-owned petroleum company, Pemex. This ultimately resulted in the dissolution of the alliance in December 2013 when the center-left PRD refused to collaborate on legislation that would have allowed for foreign investment in Mexico's oil industry.

President Andrés Manuel López Obrador (2018–present)

On July 1, 2018, Andrés Manuel López Obrador was elected president with 30,112,109 votes (53.19% of the total votes cast.) Lopez Obrador is the leader of the National Regeneration Movement and he headed the Juntos Haremos Historia coalition. The coalition also won 306/500 seats in the Chamber of Deputies, 69/100 federal Senate seats, several governorships, and numerous local elections.

On 1 December 2018, López Obrador was sworn in as Mexico's first leftist president in decades.

The administration has had to contend with the coronavirus pandemic. The number of cases has continued to rise, but Mexico has attempted the gradual reopening of the economy. At least 500 Cuban health workers are helping tackle the new coronavirus in Mexico City, Mexican officials say, making it likely the largest contingent the island has deployed globally as part of its response to the pandemic.

AMLO made his first trip outside the country to travel to Washington D.C. to sign the U.S.-Mexico-Canada Agreement. U.S. President Donald Trump and AMLO met at the White House, but Canada's Prime Minister, Justin Trudeau declined to attend, citing the coronavirus.

In June 2021 midterm elections, López Obrador's left-leaning coalition lost seats in the lower house of Congress. However, his ruling coalition maintained a simple majority, but López Obrador failed to secure the two-thirds congressional supermajority. The main opposition was a coalition of Mexico's three traditional parties: the center-right Revolutionary Institutional Party, the right-wing National Action Party and the center-left Party of the Democratic Revolution.

See also

Index of Mexico-related articles
Economic history of Mexico
Historiography of Colonial Spanish America
History of democracy in Mexico
History of the flags of Mexico
History of Roman Catholicism in Mexico
List of presidents of Mexico
List of wars involving Mexico
Mexican Revolution
Military history of Mexico
Plans in Mexican history
Politics of Mexico
Porfiriato, politics 1876–1911
Spanish empire
2009 flu pandemic in Mexico

References

Further reading
Works listed below are in English, some of which have been translated from the Spanish. There is a vast literature in Spanish.

Surveys and reference works 

 Alisky, Marvin. Historical Dictionary of Mexico (2nd ed. 2007) 744pp
 Batalla, Guillermo Bonfil. (1996) Mexico Profundo.  University of Texas Press. .
 Beezley, William, and Michael Meyer. The Oxford History of Mexico (2nd ed. 2010)  excerpt and text search
 Beezley, William, ed. A Companion to Mexican History and Culture (Blackwell Companions to World History) (2011)  excerpt and text search
 Fehrenback, T.R. (1995 revised edition) Fire and Blood: A History of Mexico. Da Capo Press; popular overview
 Hamnett, Brian R. A concise history of Mexico (Cambridge UP, 2006) excerpt
 Kirkwood, J. Burton. The history of Mexico (2nd ed. ABC-CLIO, 2009)
 Krauze, Enrique. Mexico: biography of power: a history of modern Mexico, 1810–1996 (HarperCollinsPublishers, 1997)
 MacLachlan, Colin M. and William H. Beezley. El Gran Pueblo: A History of Greater Mexico (3rd ed. 2003) 535pp
 Miller, Robert Ryal. Mexico: A History. Norman: University of Oklahoma Press 1985. 
Kirkwood, Burton. The History of Mexico (Greenwood, 2000) online edition
 Meyer, Michael C., William L. Sherman, and Susan M. Deeds. The Course of Mexican History (7th ed. Oxford U.P., 2002) online edition
 
 Werner, Michael S., ed.  Encyclopedia of Mexico: History, Society & Culture (2 vol 1997) 1440pp . Articles by multiple authors online edition
 Werner,  Michael S., ed.  Concise Encyclopedia of Mexico (2001)  850pp; a selection of previously published articles by multiple authors.

Primary sources and readers

 Jaffary, Nora E.. et al. eds. Mexican History: A Primary Source Reader (2009) 480pp
 Joseph, Gilbert M. and Timothy J. Henderson, eds. The Mexico Reader: History, Culture, Politics (2003) 808pp  excerpt and text search

Prehistory and Pre-Columbian civilizations

 Adams, Richard E.W. Prehistoric Mesoamerica: Revised Edition. University of Oklahoma Press.  1996. .
 Lopez Austin, Alfredo and Leonardo Lopez Lujan. Mexico's Indigenous Past University of Oklahoma Press. 2001. .
 Berdan, Frances. The Aztecs of Central Mexico: An Imperial Society Holt, Rinehart and Winston (1982)
 Coe, Michael. Mexico: From the Olmecs to the Aztecs.  Thames & Hudson. 2004. 5th edition. .
 Knight, Alan. Mexico: Volume 1, From the Beginning to the Spanish Conquest (v. 1 of 3 volumes series History of Mexico) (2002)  excerpt and text search

Conquest
 Hassig, Ross.Mexico and the Spanish Conquest (2nd ed. 2006)  excerpt and text search
 Thomas, Hugh. Conquest: Cortes, Montezuma, and the Fall of Old Mexico (1995) excerpt and text search

Primary sources

 Cortés, Hernán. Letters from Mexico. Yale University Press. Revised edition, 1986.
 Diaz, Bernal. The Conquest of New Spain. Penguin Classics,
 Lockhart, James (editor and translator) We People Here: Nahuatl Accounts of the Conquest of Mexico University of California Press (1992)
 León-Portilla, Miguel, editor. The Broken Spears: The Aztec Account of the Conquest of Mexico. Beacon Press. 1992. excerpt and text search

The Colonial era

 Altman, Ida, Ida, Sarah Cline, and Javier Pescador. The Early History of Greater Mexico Pearson (2003)
 Altman, Ida and James Lockhart. The Provinces of Early Mexico: Variants of Spanish American Regional Evolution UCLA Latin American Center (1976)
 Bakewell, P. J. Silver Mining and Society in Colonial Mexico, Zacatecas 1546–1700 (Cambridge Latin American Studies) (1971)
 Brading, D.A. Haciendas and Ranchos in the Mexican Bajío Cambridge University Press (1978)
 Chevalier, François. Land and Society in Colonial Mexico (1982)
 Conway, Richard. "The Environmental History of Colonial Mexico." History Compass 15.7 (2017). DOI: 10.1111/hic3.12388
 Farriss, Nancy M. Maya Society Under Colonial Rule Princeton University Press (1984)
 Gibson, Charles. The Aztecs Under Spanish Rule (Stanford University Press) 1964.
 Glasco, Sharon Bailey. Constructing Mexico City: Colonial Conflicts over Culture, Space, and Authority (2010)
 Knight, Alan. Mexico: Volume 2, the Colonial Era (2002)  excerpt and text search
 Kubler, George. Mexican Architecture in the Sixteenth Century Yale University Press (1948)
 Lockhart, James. The Nahuas After the Conquest Stanford University Press (1992)
 Ouweneel, Arij. An Ecological Interpretation of Crisis and Development in Central Mexico, 1730–1800 (1996)
 MacLachlan, Colin M., and Jaime E. Rodriguez O. The Forging of the Cosmic Race: A Reinterpretation of Colonial Mexico (1980)
 Ricard, Robert. The Spiritual Conquest of Mexico  University of California Press (1966)
 Taylor, William B. Landlord and Peasant in Colonial Oaxaca. Stanford University Press 1972.
Toussaint, Manuel. Colonial Art in Mexico University of Texas Press (1967)

Mexican Independence and the 19th century (1807–1910)

 Anna, Timothy. The Fall of Royal Government in Mexico City University of Nebraska Press (1978)
 Anna, Timothy. Forging Mexico, 1821–1835 University of Nebraska Press (2001) 
 Coatsworth, John H. Growth against Development: The Economic Impact of Railroads in Porfirian Mexico (1980)
 
 
 Fowler, Will. Santa Anna of Mexico (2009)  excerpt and text search
 Fowler-Salamini, Heather, and Mary Kay Vaughn, eds. Women of the Mexican Countryside, 1850–1990: Creating Spaces, Shaping Transition (1994).
 Green, Stanley C. The Mexican Republic: The First Decade, 1823-1832. Pittsburgh: University of Pittsburgh Press 1987.
 Hale, Charles A. Mexican Liberalism in the Age of Mora, 1821–53. Yale University Press (1968)
 Hale, Charles A. The Transformation of Liberalism in Late Nineteenth-Century Mexico. Princeton University Press (1989)
 Hamill, Hugh. The Hidalgo Revolt: Prelude to Mexican Independence. Gainesville: University of Florida Press 1966.
 Hamnett, Brian R. Juarez (1994)
 Harvey, Robert. Liberators: Latin America's Struggle For Independence, 1810–1830 (John Murray, London, 2000). 
 Henderson, Timothy J. The Mexican Wars for Independence (2010) excerpt and text search
 Henderson, Timothy J. A Glorious Defeat: Mexico and Its War with the United States (2008) excerpt and text search
 
 *Rodríguez O., Jaime E., ed. The Independence of Mexico and the Creation of the New Nation. Los Angeles: UCLA Latin American Center Publications 69, 1989.
 Rodríguez O., Jaime E. "We Are Now the True Spaniards": Sovereignty, Revolution, Independence, and the Emergence of the Federal Republic of Mexico, 1808–1824 (2012)  excerpt and text search
 
 Scholes, Walter V. Mexican Politics during the Juárez Regime 1855–1872 (University of Missouri Press, 1957)
 Sinkin, Richard N. The Mexican Reform, 1856–1876:A Study in Liberal Nation-Building (University of Texas Press, 1979)
 Stevens, Donald Fithian. Origins of Instability in Early Republican Mexico. Duke University Press 1991. 
 Tenenbaum, Barbara. The Politics of Penury: Debts and Taxes in Mexico, 1821–1856 University of New Mexico Press (1986)
 Tutino, John. From Insurrection to Revolution in Mexico: Social bases to agrarian violence, 1750–1940 Princeton University Press (1986)
 Van Young, Eric. The Other Rebellion : popular violence, ideology, and the Mexican struggle for independence, 1810 1821 Stanford University Press (2001)

Primary sources
 Raat, W. Dirk, ed. Mexico: From Independence to Revolution, 1810–1910 (1982), 308pp; 26 scholarly articles & primary documents

Revolutionary era

 Golland, David Hamilton. "Recent Works on the Mexican Revolution." Estudios Interdisciplinarios de América Latina y el Caribe 16.1 (2014).
 Gonzales, Michael J. The Mexican Revolution, 1910–1940 (2002)
 Hart, John Mason. Empire and Revolution: The Americans in Mexico Since the Civil War. Berkeley and Los Angeles: University of California Press 2002.
 Katz, Friedrich. The Life and Times of Pancho Villa. Stanford: Stanford University Press 1998.
 Knight, Alan. The Mexican Revolution, Volume 1: Porfirians, Liberals, and Peasants (1990); The Mexican Revolution, Volume 2: Counter-revolution and Reconstruction (1990); a standard scholarly history
 Knight, Alan. "The Mexican Revolution: Bourgeois? Nationalist? Or Just a 'Great Rebellion'?" Bulletin of Latin American Research (1985) 4#2 pp. 1–37 in JTSOR
 O'Malley,  Ilene V. The Myth of the Revolution: Hero Cults and the Institutionalization of the Mexican State, 1920–1940 (1986)
 Richmond,  Douglas W.  and Sam W. Haynes. The Mexican Revolution: Conflict and Consolidation, 1910–1940 (2013)
 Ruiz, Ramón Eduardo. The Great Rebellion: Mexico, 1905–1924 (1980).
 Snodgrass, Michael. Deference and Defiance in Monterrey: Workers, Paternalism, and Revolution in Mexico, 1890–1950. (Cambridge University Press, 2003) .
 Tenorio-Trillo, Mauricio. I Speak of the City: Mexico City at the Turn of the Twentieth Century. Chicago: University of California 2012.
 Vaughan, Mary Kay. Cultural Politics in Revolution: Teachers, Peasants, and Schools in Mexico, 1930–1940. Tucson: University of Arizona Press 1997.
 Womack, John. Zapata and the Mexican Revolution (1968)

Since 1940

 Alegre, Robert F. Railroad radicals in Cold War Mexico: Gender, class, and memory. Lincoln: University of Nebraska Press, [2013]
 Bratzel, John, et al. eds. Latin America during World War II (2006) ch 2
Camp, Roderic Ai. Politics in Mexico: The Democratic Consolidation (5th ed. 2006)
 Coerver, Don M., Suzanne B. Pasztor, and Robert Buffington, eds. Mexico Today: An Encyclopedia of Contemporary History and Culture (2004) 621pp excerpt and text search
 Contreras, Joseph. In the Shadow of the Giant: The Americanization of Modern Mexico (2009)  excerpt and text search
 Dent, David W. Encyclopedia of Modern Mexico  (2002); since 1940; 376pp
 Hamilton, Nora. Mexico, Political Social and Economic Evolution (2011)
 Niblo, Stephen R. Mexico in the 1940s: Modernity, Politics, and Corruption (1999)
 Preston, Julia, and Samuel Dillon. Opening Mexico: The Making of a Democracy (2005) in-depth narrative by American journalists on post 1960 era.  excerpt and text search

Historiography and memory

 
 Boyer, Christopher R., ed. Land between Waters: Environmental Histories of Modern Mexico (U. of Arizona Press, 2012).  328 pp.  online review
 Brienen, Rebecca P., and Margaret A. Jackson, es. Invasion and Transformation: Interdisciplinary Perspectives on the Conquest of Mexico (2008)
 Chorba, Carrie C. Mexico, From Mestizo to Multicultural: National Identity and Recent Representations of the Conquest (2007) excerpt and text search
 
 Díaz-Maldonado, Rodrigo. "National Identity Building in Mexican Historiography during the Nineteenth century: An Attempt at Synthesis." Storia della storiografia 70.2 (2016): 73–93.
 Gallegos, Laura Olivia Machuca, and Alejandro Tortolero Villaseñor. "From haciendas to rural elites: Agriculture and economic development in the historiography of rural Mexico." Historia agraria: Revista de agricultura e historia rural 81 (2020): 31-62. online
 Garrigan, Shelley E. Collecting Mexico: Museums, Monuments, and the Creation of National Identity(University of Minnesota Press; 2012) 233 pages; scholarly analysis of Mexico's self-image, 1867–1910, using public monuments, fine-arts collecting, museums, and Mexico's representation at the Paris world's fair
 Golland, David Hamilton. "Recent Works on the Mexican Revolution." Estudios Interdisciplinarios de América Latina y el Caribe 16.1 (2014).
 
 
 Krauze, Enrique. Mexico: Biography of Power. Harper Perennial (1998)
 Lomnitz, Claudio. Deep Mexico, Silent Mexico: An Anthropology of Nationalism (University of Minnesota Press 2001)
 Pick, Zuzana M.  Constructing the Image of the Mexican Revolution: Cinema and the Archive (University of Texas Press, 2011) online review
 Troyan, Bret. "Mexico" in 
 Weber, David J. “The Spanish Borderlands, Historiography Redux.” The History Teacher, 39#1 (2005), pp. 43–56., online.
 Young, Eric Van. Writing Mexican History (Stanford University Press; 2012)

External links

 "Historical Text Archive" 160 articles by scholars
 Hernán Cortés: Página de relación
 Brown University Library: Three for Three Million –-Information about the Paul R. Dupee Jr. '65 Mexican History Collection in the John Hay Library, including maps and photos of books.
Economic Struggles of the 80s from the Dean Peter Krogh Foreign Affairs Digital Archives
Embattled Country from the Dean Peter Krogh Foreign Affairs Digital Archives
Old Mexico: Vintage Photos  – slideshow by Life magazine
Mexico: From Empire to Revolution –-Photographs from the Getty Research Institute's collections exploring Mexican history and culture though images produced between 1857 and 1923.
A Continent Divided: The U.S.-Mexico War, Center for Greater Southwestern Studies, the University of Texas at Arlington
US-Mexican War –-U.S. political context and overview of the military campaign that ended with the Treaty of Guadalupe Hidalgo, 1816–1848. Provides links to U.S. military sources.
Civilizations in America –- An overview of Mexican civilization.
Time Line of Mexican History –-  A Pre-Columbian History timeline and a timeline of Mexico after the arrival of the Spanish.
 History of Mexico at The History Channel
 C.M. Mayo's blog for researchers of Mexico's Second Empire, a period also known as the French Intervention
 

 
Latin American studies